This list includes past and present buildings, facilities and institutions associated with the Society of Jesus. In each country, sites are listed in chronological order of start of Jesuit association.

The Jesuits have built many new colleges and churches over the centuries, for which the start date indicated is generally the start of the project (e.g. invitation or grant from a local ruler) rather than the opening of the institution which often happened several years later. The Jesuits also occasionally took over a pre-existing institution and/or building, for example a number of medieval abbeys in the Holy Roman Empire.

In the third quarter of the 18th century, the suppression of the Society of Jesus abruptly terminated the Jesuit presence in nearly all facilities that existed at the time. Many of these, however, continued their educational mission under different management; in cases where they moved to different premises from the ones operated by the Jesuits, the Jesuit site is mentioned in the list as precursor to the later institution. Outside Rome, sites operated by Jesuits since the early 19th century are generally different from those before the 18th-century suppression. Later episodes of expulsion of the Jesuits also terminated their involvement in a number of institutions, e.g. in Russia in 1820, parts of Italy at several times during the 19th century, Switzerland in 1847, Germany in 1872, Portugal in 1910, China after 1949, Cuba in 1961, or Haiti in 1964.

The territorial allocation across countries uses contemporary boundaries, which often differ from historical ones. An exception is made for Rome which is highlighted at the start. Similarly and for simplicity, only modern place names are mentioned, spelled as on their main Wikipedia page in English, even in cases where those modern names were never in use during the time of local Jesuit involvement.

Europe

Rome

  in La Storta district, site of the Ignatius of Loyola's vision in 1537
 Professed house and mother church (1540–1773 and since 1814), now Church of the Gesù; burial place of Peter Faber, Ignatius of Loyola, and numerous later Jesuit leaders
 The rooms where Ignatius of Loyola had lived next to the earlier Church of Santa Maria della Strada were preserved during the Gesù's construction and are still extant
 House of Saint Martha established by Ignatius of Loyola (1543–1560), now Santa Marta al Collegio Romano
 Roman College (1551–1773 and since 1814), renamed in 1873 Pontifical Gregorian University 
 Ignatius created the School of Grammar, Humanities and Christian Doctrine, which was premised in successive locations near his professed house: initially on Piazza d'Aracoeli, then behind the Church of Santo Stefano del Cacco, then in 1558 in a house behind Church of Santa Maria in Via Lata which since gave way to Piazza del Collegio Romano
 The College's eponymous building was built and used by the Jesuits from 1584 to 1870 with successive expansions and interruptions in 1773–1824 and 1848–1850; it now mainly hosts the Ennio Quirino Visconti Lyceum-Gymnasium
 The college's chapel is now the Church of Saint Ignatius, burial place of Aloysius Gonzaga and Robert Bellarmine
 The Oratory of Saint Francis Xavier "del Caravita" (1631–1773, 1814–1925 and since 2000) was commissioned by the Jesuits on an adjacent lot
 from 1651 the College housed the Kircherian Museum, sometimes viewed as the world's first museum
 The College was renamed Pontifical Gregorian University in 1873. Between that date and 1930 it was located in Palazzo Gabrielli-Borromeo, across the street from Sant'Ignazio
 The Palazzo Gabrielli-Borromeo also hosted the German College from 1873 to 1886, and the Order's General Curia from 1895 to 1927. It is now home to the Collegio Bellarmino, a Jesuit postgraduate institution 
 In 1879 the former College's secondary education role was revived in the Palazzo Massimo alle Terme, rebuilt in the 1880s by Jesuit aristocrat Massimiliano Massimo, now home of the National Roman Museum. In 1960 this operation moved to the EUR neighborhood and is now the Massimiliano Massimo Institute 
 In 1930 the Gregorian University moved into its current premises on piazza della Pilotta
 Several of the Pontifical Colleges in Rome have been under Jesuit management for extended periods: 
 German College (1552–1773), renamed German and Hungarian College after its 1580 merger with the Hungarian college created in 1579
 English College (1579–1773)
  (1584–1773 and since 1893)
 Greek College (1591–1604, 1622–1769 and 1890–1897)
 Scots College (1615–1773)
 Irish College (1635–1773)
 Latin American College (since 1858)
 Ukrainian College (1897–1904)
 Russian College (since 1929)
  (since 1934)
 Pontifical Roman Major Seminary (1565–1773), initially in the Roman College building and from 1608 in nearby Palazzo Gabrielli-Borromeo; in 1726 absorbed an adjacent church and rededicated it to Saint Malo (Macuto in Italian), now the Church of San Macuto 
 Novitiate on Quirinal Hill (1566–1773, 1814–1873 with an interruption in 1849, and since 1925), now Sant'Andrea al Quirinale, burial place of Stanislaus Kostka
 Gregorian Tower of the Vatican Palace, original Vatican Observatory, run mostly by Jesuits since 1582
 Residenza San Pietro Canisio or "The Canisio" (since 1900), formerly a villa of the Barberini family
 Pontifical Biblical Institute (since 1909)
 Pontifical Oriental Institute (since 1917), initially hosted in Palazzo dei Convertendi until 1926
 Casa Generalizia adjoining the Canisio residence (since 1927), seat of the order's General Curia, of the Jesuit Refugee Service and of the Jesuit Library (Biblioteca Hans Peter Kolvenbach)
 Under the Lateran Treaty of 1929, the Jesuit headquarters and Canisio Residence are properties of the Holy See, known in Rome as Zona Extraterritoriale
 Church of San Roberto Bellarmino in the Parioli neighborhood (since 1931)
 Vatican Radio has been run by Jesuits since its creation in 1931
 , headquarters of Jesuit periodical La Civiltà Cattolica (since 1951)
 John Felice Rome Center, Rome campus of Loyola University Chicago (since 1962)

Albania
 Albanian Pontifical Seminary in Shkodër (1859–1946 and since 1991)
 Xavier College, now Pjetër Meshkalla High School in Shkodër (1877–1944 and since 1994)
 Sacred Heart Church in Tirana (1938–67)

Austria

 Professed house in Vienna (1554–1773 and 1814–1852), now Park Hyatt hotel and  
 Jesuit college in Innsbruck (1562–1773 and 1839–1848), now Akademisches Gymnasium and 
 Jesuit college in Graz (1576–1773), University from 1585, now Akademisches Gymnasium; the non-adjacent college church has been Graz Cathedral since 1786 
 Jesuit novitiate in Vienna (1582–1773), now  and Church of Saint Anna
 Saint Bernhard Abbey in Sankt Bernhard-Frauenhofen (1586–1773)
  in Millstatt Abbey (1598–1773)
 Jesuit college in Wiener Neustadt (?–1773), now  and 
  in Linz (1602–1678)
 Jesuit college in Klagenfurt (1604–1773), now ; the church used by the Jesuits is now Klagenfurt Cathedral 
 Eberndorf Abbey in Eberndorf (1604–1773)
  in Traunkirchen (1622–1773)
 University of Vienna (1623–1773), including the Jesuit Church which has been again under Jesuits' care since 1856
 The Vienna Observatory started there in the 1750s before moving to its current premises in 1883
 Jesuit college in Steyr (1632–1773), now 
  in Burgenland (c.1640–1773)
 Stella Matutina School in Feldkirch, Vorarlberg (1649–1773, 1856–1938, and 1946–1979), now ; precursor to 
  in Geidorf near Graz (1654–1773), now a ruin
  in Leoben (1660–1773)
 Saint Ignatius Church in Linz (1669–1773), since 1783 Old Cathedral 
 Theresianum boarding school in Vienna (1746–1773)
 Aloysian College in Linz (since 1837, with interruption 1897–1912)
  in Baumgartenberg (1852–1865)
 Kalksburg College in Vienna (since 1856, with interruption 1938–1947)
 Collegium Canisianum in Innsbruck (since 1857, with interruption 1938–1945)
 Novitiate in Sankt Andrä (1859–1969, with interruption 1938–1945); St. Andrew's Church was under Jesuit care from 1945 to 2007
  in Steyr (1865–2019)
 Church of Saint Peter Canisius in Vienna (since 1899)
  in Vienna (since 2000)

Belarus

  in Nyasvizh (1584–1773), now Corpus Christi Church
  in Orsha (1610–1820), reconstructed in the early 21st century
  in Babruysk (1618–1773, with interruptions), initially a mission until 1630
  in Grodno (1622–1773), now Catholic Cathedral of Saint Francis Xavier 
  in Novogrudok (1626–1773), initially a mission and from 1631 to 1714 a residence, now demolished
  in Brest (1629–1773), now Brest Fortress; college church demolished in the mid-20th century
  in Pinsk (1638–1773), now ; college church demolished in the mid-20th century
  in Vitebsk (1640–1820), until 1682 a residence, later , demolished in the 1950s
  in Mogilev (1680–1820), until 1799 a residence, later , demolished in the 1950s
  in Slutsk (1689–1773), initially a mission and from 1703 to 1714 a residence
  in Mstsislaw (1690–1820), initially a mission and from 1711 to 1799 a residence, now 
 Jesuit residence in Slonim (1709–1781)
 Eastern Catholic Jesuit seminary in Albertyn Mansion near Slonim (1924–1939)

Belgium

 Jesuit college in Antwerp (1562–1773), now Church of St. Charles Borromeo 
  in Tournai (1562–1773), now a seminary
  in Nandrin (1574–1773)
 Jesuit college known as the Collège en Isle in Liège (1582–1773), now University of Liège
 Jesuit college in Kortrijk (1583–1773), now 
 Jesuit college in Ypres (1585–1773)
 Jesuit college in Ghent (1585–1773), now campus of Ghent University
 Jesuit college in Brussels (1586–1773) on the location that is now Place de la Justice, with  demolished in 1812
 Jesuit college in Leuven (1598–1773), now  and 
 Jesuit college in Bruges (1596–1773), now College of Europe and Church of Saint Walburga 
 Jesuit college in Mons (1598–1773)
  villa near Leuven (early 17th century), now a retreat venue for KU Leuven
 Jesuit college in Namur (1610–1773), now  and  
 Jesuit novitiate in Mechelen (1611–1773), now 
  in Liège (1614–1773), now offices of the Government of Wallonia
 Jesuit school, then college at Marche-en-Famenne (1620–1773), now a hotel with  converted into a restaurant
 College of Saint Joseph in Aalst (1622–1773 and since 1831) 
  in Chaudfontaine (built 1688)
  Jesuit college in Lier (1749–1773), now  including the  converted into an arts venue
 College of Saint John Berchmans in Brussels (since 1814)
 Collège Notre-Dame de la Paix in Namur (since 1831), later developed into Université de Namur
 Collège Saint-Paul (Godinne) opened in 1927 as a dormitory (internat) of the college
 College of Saint Barbara in Ghent (since 1833)
 Church of Our Lady of Leliendaal in Mechelen (since 1834)
 Drongen Abbey in Ghent (since 1837)
 Collège Saint-Servais in Liège (since 1838)
  in Tournai (1839–1957)
 College of Our Lady in Antwerp (since 1840)
 Community of the Sacred Heart in Bruges (since 1840), including the 
 College of Saint Joseph in Turnhout (since 1845)
 Collège Saint-Stanislas in Mons (since 1845)
 Saint-Ignatius School for Higher Education in Commerce in Antwerp (1852–2003), now merged into the University of Antwerp; Saint Ignatius University Centre was established in 2003 following the merger
 Collège Saint-François-Xavier in Verviers (since 1855)
 Jesuit novitiate in Arlon (1855–1967), now  
 Community of the Gesù, Brussels (1856-late 20th century), now  
  in Liège (1892–1949)
 College of Saint Michael in Brussels (since 1905), including the Church of Saint John Berchmans 
 Xaverius College in Borgerhout near Antwerp (since 1935)
  (since 1935), initially in Leuven, then in Brussels after 1946
 Catholic Office of Information and Initiative for Europe in Brussels (since 1956), known since 2012 as Jesuit European Social Centre
 University College of Saint John Berchmans in Heverlee near Leuven (since 1958)
 College of John of Ruysbroeck in Brussels (since 1968)
 La Pairelle, Ignatian Spirituality Centre, in Wépion near Namur (since 1971)
 Chapel of the Resurrection in the European Quarter of Brussels (since 2001)
 Collège Matteo Ricci, Brussels (since 2019)

Bosnia and Herzegovina

 Jesuit seminar, now  in Travnik (1882–1945 and since 1999)
  in Sarajevo (1893–1944)

Croatia

 Jesuit college in Zagreb (1607–1773), now Klovićevi Dvori Gallery and St. Catherine's Church; precursor to the Classical Gymnasium in Zagreb
 The Neoacademia Zagrabiensis, created within the college (1662–1773), was the precursor to the University of Zagreb 
 Jesuit church in Rijeka, now Rijeka Cathedral (1638–1773)
 Collegium Ragusinum in Dubrovnik (1658–1773), now Church of Saint Ignatius, Boscovich Gymnasium and Diocesan seminary
 Kutjevo Abbey in Slavonia (1698–1773)
 Jesuit college in Požega (1699–1773), from 1761 Academia Posegana, now Catholic High School
 Jesuit college in Karlovac (1736–1773)
 Jesuit college in Osijek (1766–1773)
 Basilica of the Heart of Jesus in Zagreb (since 1898)
 Jesuit Classical Gymnasium in Osijek (since 1998)

Czechia

 Clementinum college in the Old Town of Prague (1556–1773), now National Library of the Czech Republic and St. Salvator Church
 Jesuits also dominated Charles University from 1622, and in 1654 the Clementinum merged with the University's Karolinum to form Charles-Ferdinand University 
 Jesuit college and university in Olomouc (1566–1773), now Palacký University Olomouc and 
  in Brno (1582–1773), now 
  in Český Krumlov (1588–1773), now  and Church of St. Vitus 
  in Chomutov (1589–1773), now  and 
 Jesuit college in Bohosudov near Krupka (1591–1773 and 1853–1950), now  and 
  in Jindřichův Hradec (1594–1773), now the National Museum of Photography and 
  in Chomutov (1605–1773), now part of the 
 Bethlehem Chapel in Prague (1622–1773)
 Church of Our Lady before Týn in Prague (1623–1773)
  in Kutná Hora (1633–1773), now  and Church of Saint Barbara
 Jesuit college in Klatovy (1634–1773), now  and 
 Jesuit college in Březnice (1642?–1773), now  
  in Uherské Hradiště (1662–1773), now a cultural center and the Church of Saint Francis Xavier
  complex near Příbram (1647–1773), now  and Basilica of the Assumption of the Virgin Mary
 Professed house in Prague (1673–1773), now Church of Saint Nicholas in Malá Strana 
  in Litoměřice (1701–1773)
 Hostýn pilgrimage church and monastery in the Beskids (1887–1950)
  in Velehrad (1890–1950 and since 1990), now also  and

Denmark

 Saint Andrew's School in Ordrup, Copenhagen (1871–1953), now St. Andrew's Church, Gentofte Municipality
 Saint Canute School in Copenhagen (1887–1973), now Mariendals Friskole
 Church of Jesus' Heart in Copenhagen (1895–2015)
  in Copenhagen (since 1950)

Estonia
  in Tartu (1586–1625)

France

 Martyrium of Saint Denis beneath the Church of Saint-Pierre de Montmartre in Paris, the site of the original vow of the Society of Jesus on 15 August 1534
 Jesuit college in Billom (1558–1762, interrupted 1593–1604), now disaffected
  in Pamiers, County of Foix (1559–1562 and 1630–1762), now Collège Joseph-Paul Rambaud 
 Jesuit college in Mauriac (1560–1762 with interruption 1595–1605), now Lycée Marmontel 
 Jesuit college in Tournon-sur-Rhône (1561–1763), now 
  in Rodez (1562–1763), now chapel and offices of the Departmental Council of Aveyron; precursor to 
 Jesuit college in Lille, Flanders (1562–1765), now offices of the Prefecture and Church of Saint Stephen 
 Jesuit college in Toulouse (1562–1763), now Lycée Pierre-de-Fermat
 Jesuit college in Cambrai in the eponymous Bishopric (1563–1765), now Le Labo cultural center and  
 Collège de Clermont in Paris (1564–1762, interrupted 1595–1618), renamed Louis-Le-Grand in 1682, now Lycée Louis-le-Grand
 Jesuit college in Verdun (1564–1763), now Collège Buvignier and its 
 Jesuit college in Avignon, Comtat Venaissin (1565–1763), now Ecole primaire Frédéric-Mistral and Lapidary Museum in the former chapel; precursor to Lycée Saint-Joseph of Avignon
 Collège of the Trinity in Lyon (1565–1762, interrupted 1595–1604), now Collège-lycée Ampère and Trinity Chapel
 Jesuit college in Chambéry, Savoy (1565–1773), now  
  in Douai, Flanders (1568–1763), now 
 Jesuit college in Saint-Omer, Artois (1568–1762), now Lycée Alexandre Ribot and  
  in Pont-à-Mousson, Lorraine (1572–1768), now Lycée Jacques Marquette
 Jesuit college in Nevers (1572–1762, interrupted 1594–1607), now Church of Saint Peter
  in Bourges (1573–1595 and 1605–1764), now 
 Professed House in Paris (1580–1763, interrupted 1595-1606), now Lycée Charlemagne and Church of Saint-Paul-Saint-Louis
 Jesuit college and university in Molsheim, Alsace (1580–1765), now Jesuit Church 
 Jesuit college in Eu (1581–1763, with interruption 1594–1607), with surviving 
 Jesuit college in Dijon (1581–1763), now  including the former college chapel
 Jesuit college in Dole, Franche-Comté (1582–1763), now  and Chapel of the Jesuits
 Jesuit college in Embrun (1582–1763, interrupted 1585–1604), now a residential building
  in Valenciennes, Hainaut (1585–1763), now Municipal Library and Auditorium Saint-Nicolas in the former college chapel
 Jesuit college in Le Puy-en-Velay (1588–1763), now Collège Lafayette and 
  in Avignon, Comtat Venaissin (1589–1762), now a hotel (Cloître Saint-Louis),  and the Chapel of Saint Louis
 Jesuit college in Auch (1590–1762), now 
 Jesuit college in Agen (1591–1763)
  in Périgueux (1591–1762), now Espace culturel François-Mitterrand; precursor to 
 Jesuit college in Rouen (1593–1762, interrupted 1595–1604), now Lycée Pierre-Corneille and Church of Saint Louis 
 Jesuit college in Nîmes (1596–1762), now 
 Jesuit college in Besançon, Franche-Comté (1597–1763), now  and 
 Jesuit college in Limoges (1597–1763), now  including the former college chapel
 Royal college in Béziers (1599–1763), now 
 Jesuit college in Bergues, Flanders (1600–1763), now Collège Saint-Winoc
 Jesuit novitiate in Nancy, Lorraine (1602–1763)
 Jesuit college in Arras, Artois (1603–1762), now Hotel de l'Univers
 Jesuit college in Aubenas (1603–1762)
 Irish College, Douai, Flanders (1603–1763)
 St. George's Church in Haguenau, Alsace (1604–1763)
 Jesuit college in Cahors (1604–1762), now 
  in La Flèche (1604–1762), now Prytanée national militaire and  
 Jesuit college in Rennes (1604–1762), now  and 
 Royal college in Vienne (1604–1764), now 
 Jesuit college in Moulins (1605–1762), now 
 Jesuit college of Saint Nicholas in Amiens (1606–1762), no longer extant
 Jesuit college in Reims (1606–1762), now Reims campus of Sciences Po and 
  in Carpentras (1607–1762), now Maison du Citoyen and former chapel
 Jesuit novitiate in Bordeaux (1607–1762), now  
 Royal college in Poitiers (1607–1762), now Collège Henri-IV, Les Beaux-Arts/École d'arts plastiques,  and 
 Jesuit college in Caen (1608–1763), formerly , destroyed in World War II; the non-adjacent  is still extant
 Jesuit novitiate in Paris (1610–1763), demolished in the early 19th century
 Jesuit college in Vesoul, Franche-Comté (1610–1762), now former 
 Jesuit college in Angoulême (1611–1762), now 
 Jesuit college in Saintes (1611–1762), now 
 Jesuit college in Roanne (1611–1762), now Lycée Jean-Puy and Chapel of Saint Michael
 Jesuit college in Aire-sur-la-Lys, Flanders (1612–1763), now Collège Sainte-Marie and 
 Scots College in Douai, Flanders (1612–1763)
 Jesuit college in Charleville, Principality of Arches (1612–1762), with remaining Chapelle des Jésuites
 Jesuit college in Hesdin, Artois (1613–1762), now a hospital
  in Ensisheim, Alsace (1614–1762), now prison 
 Jesuit college in Sélestat, Alsace (1615–1767), now Ecole Sainte-Foy and St. Faith's Church
 Jesuit college in Pontoise (1614–1763), later demolished
 Jesuit residence in Marseille (1616–1763), from 1727 Collège Saint-Jaume, later demolished
 Basilique Notre-Dame de Marienthal near Haguenau, Alsace (1616–1764)
  in Bar-le-Duc, Lorraine (1617–1762)
 Royal college in Orléans (1617–1762), now the Orléans campus of Institut supérieur du commerce de Paris
 Jesuit college in Bailleul, Flanders (1617–1762), with some remains integrated into the town's World War I monument
 Jesuit college in Autun (1618–1763), now  and Church of Our Lady of the Assumption
 Jesuit college in Cassel, Flanders (1618–1762), now Jesuits' Chapel
  in Chaumont (1618–1763), now Collège Camille Saint-Saëns and Jesuit's Chapel
 Jesuit college in Aurillac (1619–1764), now Collège Jeanne de la Treilhe
  in Maubeuge, Hainaut (1619-1765), now Salle Sthrau (former chapel), Pôle culturel Henri Lafitte, and Collège Ernest Coutelle
 Jesuit college in Quimper (1620–1763), now Collège la Tour d'Auvergne and Chapel of the jesuits
 Jesuit college in Aix-en-Provence (1621–1763), now Lycée du Sacré-Coeur
 Jesuit college in Béthune, Artois (1621–1762), now Lycée Louis Blaringhem
 Jesuit college in Langres (1621–1763), now Collège Diderot
 Jesuit college in Auxerre (1622–1763), now 
 Jesuit college in Gray (1622–1763), now Lycée Augustin-Cournot
 Royal college in Grenoble (1622–1763), now Lycée Stendhal
 Jesuit college of Saint Louis in Metz (1622–1763)
 Jesuit college in Pau (1622–1763), now Lycée Louis-Barthou and 
 Jesuit college in Albi (1623–1763), now  with the former chapel converted into the Lycée's library
 Jesuit college in Bourg-en-Bresse (1623–1762), now 
 Jesuit college in Carcassonne (1623–1763), now Maison des Associations and auditorium in the former chapel
 Jesuit college in Sens (1623–1762), now Collège Stéphane-Mallarmé
 Jesuit college in Armentières, Flanders (1623-1767), demolished in 1798
 Jesuit college in Montpellier (1626–1762), now Musée Fabre and Church of Notre-Dame des Tables; precursor to 
 Oelenberg Abbey in Reiningue, Alsace (1626–1773), now a Trappist monastery
 Estate and retreat near Paris (1626-1763), known as Mont-Louis after 1652, now Père Lachaise Cemetery
 Jesuit college in La Roche-sur-Foron, Savoy (1628–1712), now médiathèque
 Royal college in La Rochelle (1629–1762), now  and Chapelle Fromentin converted into an arts venue
 Jesuit college of Saint Yves in Vannes (1630–1762), now  and 
 Jesuit college in Dunkirk, Flanders (1631–1762), destroyed in stages between 1810 and 1940
 Jesuit college in Épinal, Lorraine (1633–1763), destroyed in September 1944; the chapel had been demolished in the late 19th century
 Jesuit college in Chalon-sur-Saône (1634–1763), now Lycée Emiland Gauthey (chapel demolished in 1890)
  in Clermont-Ferrand (1634–1762), now 
 Royal college in Montauban (1634–1762), now a cultural center, office du tourisme and Church of Saint Joseph
 Jesuit college in Bastia, Corsica (1635–1769), now Collège Simon-Vinciguerra and  
 Jesuit college in Tours (1635–1762), destroyed in 1944
 Jesuit college in Fontenay-le-Comte (1637–1763), now École Intercommunale de Musique et de Danse
 Jesuit college in Arles (1639–1763), now Museon Arlaten
 Jesuit college in Saint-Flour (1643–1763)
 Royal college in Compiègne (1653–1762)
 Royal college in Sedan (1663–1763), now part of Collège Turenne
 Jesuit college in Paray-le-Monial (1633–1762), now Lycée Jeanne-d'Arc and  rebuilt in the 20th century
 Church of Our Lady of Assumption in Metz (1642–1762)
 Jesuit college in Castres (1664–1762), now Collège Jean-Jaurès
 Royal college in Perpignan (1667–1763); precursor to 
 Jesuit college in Strasbourg (1685–1762), now 
 Jesuit college in Die (1696–1763), now Calvinist church (temple protestant) in the former chapel
 Jesuit college in Colmar (1714–1763), now  including the Chapel of Saint Peter
 Jesuit college in Le Cateau-Cambrésis (1716–1763), now Lycée Camille-Desmoulins
 Jesuit college in Hagenau (1730–1762), now a retirement house, on the site of the former 
 Jesuit college in Saint-Nicolas-de-Port, Lorraine (1753–1768), now demolished
 Abbey of Saint-Acheul in Amiens (1816–1830)
  in Laval (1816–1968)
  in Marseille (1839–1901)
  in Jouhe (1843–1961)
 Notre Dame de Mongré High School in Villefranche-sur-Saône (since 1848)
 Lycée la Providence in Amiens (since 1850)
 Lycée Saint-Joseph-de-Tivoli in Bordeaux (since 1850)
 Lycée Saint-Joseph in Avignon (since 1850)
 Collège Saint-Joseph in Sarlat (1850–1967)
  in Vannes (since 1850)
 Sainte Marie La Grand'Grange in Saint-Chamond, Loire (since after 1850)
  in Metz (1851–1861)
  in Paris (1852–1901)
 Lycée privé Sainte-Geneviève in Versailles (since 1854)
  in Paris (since 1855)
 Centre Sèvres (since 1974)
 Lycée Saint-Marc in Lyon (since 1871)
 Provence School in Marseille (since 1873)
 Caousou School in Toulouse (since 1874)
 Saint-Joseph School in Reims (1874–1901 with interruptions after 1880)
  in Lille (1876–1968)
  in Évreux (1882–1963)
 Lycée Saint-Louis-de-Gonzague in Paris (since 1894)
 Institut catholique d'arts et métiers in Lille (since 1898), Nantes (since 1990), Toulouse (since 1993), La Roche-sur-Yon (since 1994), Vannes (since 2001), and Sénart (since 2012)
 Le Marais Sainte-Thérèse Professional School in Saint-Étienne (since 1913)
 Multi-disciplinary training center at the former Rothschild mansion of Les Fontaines near Chantilly (1946–1998), now a conference center of Capgemini
 Catholic Office of Information and Initiative for Europe in Strasbourg (since 1956)
 Ricci Institute in Paris (since 1972)
 Jesuit archive in Vanves (since 1989)
 Fénelon - La Trinité School in Lyon (since 2003)

Germany

 Jesuit college in Ingolstadt, Bavaria (1556–1773), now Staatliche Fachober- und Berufsoberschule Ingolstadt and Canisius Convent; college church demolished 1859
 Wilhelminum college in Munich (1559–1773), now Old Academy, Bavarian Statistical Office and Church of Saint Michael; precursor to Wilhelmsgymnasium
 The nearby Bürgersaalkirche was originally built 1709–1710 as an assembly hall of the Sodality of Our Lady
 Palatine College of the Society of Jesus in Mainz, Rhineland (1561–1773), now  of the University of Mainz; precursor to Rabanus-Maurus-Gymnasium
  in Würzburg, Franconia (1567–1773)
  in Speyer, Rhineland (1567–1773), demolished in the 19th century except a crypt
 Jesuit college in Fulda, Hesse (1572–1773), now ; precursor to the Fulda monastery school
 Jesuit college in Heiligenstadt, Thuringia (1575–1773), now ; precursor to Staatliches Gymnasium Johann-Georg Lingemann
 Jesuit college in Landsberg am Lech, Bavaria  (1576–1773), now New Municipal Museum and 
  in Augsburg (1582–1773), mostly demolished in the 19th century except a wing that includes the 
 Jesuit college in Paderborn, Westphalia (1585–1773), from 1616 a university, now Gymnasium Theodorianum and 
  in Friedberg, Bavaria (1587–1773), now municipal administration building
  in Münster, Westphalia (1588–1773), formerly Gymnasium Paulinum, now ; precursor to University of Münster 
 Biburg Abbey in Biburg, Bavaria (1589–1773)
 Shrine of Our Lady of Altötting (1591–1773)
  manor in Munich (1594–1773), now a private school and horse-riding center
 Jesuit college in Hildesheim (1595–1773, with interruption during the Thirty Years' War), now 
 Jesuit monastery in Forstern, Bavaria (1595–1773)
 Himmelthal Abbey in Elsenfeld, Franconia (1595–1773)
  in Ebersberg, Bavaria (1595–1773), now a tax office and 
  in Dirmstein, Rhineland (late 16th century–1773), now a winery
 Jesuit college in Aachen (1600–1773), now St. Michael's Church; precursor to 
  monastery in Heusenstamm (1605–1724), now a farm
  in Xanten, Rhineland (1609–1773)
  in Erfurt, Thuringia (1611–1773), with one wing still extant on Schlösserstrasse
  in Passau, Bavaria (1611–1773), now ,  and St. Michael's Church 
 Jesuit college in Worms (1613–1773, with interruption during the Nine Years' War), now Magnuskirche; precursor to 
 Jesuit college in Neuss, Rhineland (1616–1773), since demolished; precursor to 
  in Mindelheim, Bavarian Swabia (1618–1773), now ,  and 
  in Düsseldorf (1619–1773), later , now Hotel De Medici and Church of Saint Andrew; precursor to 
 Jesuit college of the University of Freiburg in Freiburg im Breisgau (1620–1773), now University College Freiburg, Uniseum and University Church; also precursor to 
  in Baden-Baden (1622–1773), now municipal administrative offices
 Jesuit college in Bad Münstereifel, Rhineland (1625–1773), now  and Church of Saint Donatus
  in Amberg, Bavaria (1626–1773), now  and 
 Jesuit college in Burghausen, Bavaria (1627–1773), now  and Church of Saint Joseph
 Kastl Abbey in Kastl, Bavaria (1627–1773) 
  in Mindelheim, Bavarian Swabia (1618–1773)
  in Kaufbeuren, Bavarian Swabia (1627–1773, with interruption 1649–1651), now rectory of the 
  in Düren, Eifel (1629–1773), destroyed during World War II
  in Goslar (1630–1632); the unfinished buildings collapsed in 1722
  in Straubing, Bavaria (1631–1773), now police inspectorate office and Jesuitenkirche; precursor to 
  in Hadamar, Hesse (1639–1773), now offices of the Diocese of Limburg and Church of John of Nepomuk; precursor to 
 Jesuit college in Osnabrück, Westphalia (1625–1773 with interruption 1633–1650), now Gymnasium Carolinum and 
 Jesuit college in Meppen, Emsland (1642–1773), now  and 
 Weggental pilgrimage church near Rottenburg am Neckar (1658–1773)
 Jesuit college in Jülich, Rhineland (1664–1773), destroyed in 1945; precursor to 
 Jesuit residence at Echenbrunn Abbey in Gundelfingen an der Donau, Bavaria (1672–1773), now 
 Jesuit college in Bonn (1673–1773), now ; precursor to 
  in Reichertshofen, Bavaria (1685–1773)
 Jesuit school in Wetzlar (1695–1773)
 Jesuit college of Heidelberg University in Heidelberg (1698–1773), now Anglistisches Seminar and 
  in Mainz (1701–1773), now a retirement home (rebuilt after World War II) and 
  in Siegen, Westphalia (1702–1773)
 Neuburg Abbey near Heidelberg (1706–1773)
 Jesuit college in Büren, Westphalia (1719–1773), now  and  
 Jesuit college in Mannheim, Rhineland (1720–1773), now church offices, Ursulinen-Gymnasium and Jesuit Church; predecessor to 
 University of Fulda in Fulda, Hesse (1734–1773), now Adolf-von-Dalberg-Schule
 Jesuit observatory at Schwetzingen Palace (1761–1770s)
 Mannheim Observatory (1772–1788)
 Jesuit college and monastery in Maria Laach Abbey (1820–1872), now a Beuronese monastery
  in Sigmaringen (1852–1872), now a Franciscan monastery
  in Aachen (1858–1872)
 Aloysius College in Bonn (since 1921, with interruption 1938–1946)
  in Dresden (since 1921, with interruption 1941–1945)
 Canisius College in Berlin (since 1925, with interruption 1940–1945)
 Munich School of Philosophy in Munich (since 1925)
 Sankt Georgen Graduate School of Philosophy and Theology in Frankfurt (since 1926)
  in Saarlouis (1929–2007), now a facility of the Priestly Fraternity of Saint Peter
 Saint Blasius College in Sankt Blasien (since 1934, with interruption 1939–1945)
 Saint Ansgar School in Hamburg (1946–1993)
 Church of Saint Peter am Perlach in Augsburg (1954–2010)
 Church of Saint Peter in Cologne (since 1960)
 Heinrich Pesch House in Ludwigshafen (since 2013)

Greece
 Jesuit mission on Chios Island (1590–18th century)
 Jesuit complex in Kalamitsia on Naxos Island (late 17th century), now in ruins
 Jesuit establishment beneath Exomvourgo Mountain on Tinos Island (1660s–1846), now Greek Catholic monastery of the Sacred Heart of Jesus 
 Jesuit mission in Thessaloniki (1706–1784)
 Jesuit monastery on Syros Island (1744-?)
 Jesuit monastery in the village of Loutra on Tinos Island (since 1837), hosting a Folk Museum since 1994

Hungary

 Jesuit missions in Pécs (from 1612), Kecskemét (from 1633), Andocs (from 1642) and Veszprém in Ottoman Hungary (17th century)
 Jesuit college in Győr (1627–1773), now benedictine priory and Church of Saint Ignatius
 Jesuit residence in Gyöngyös (1633–1773), now ; precursor to 
 Jesuit college in Sopron (1637–1773)
 Jesuit college in Kőszeg (1677–1773), now Church of Saint James
 Jesuit college on Buda Hill (1686–1773), now Hilton Budapest and Matthias Church
 Parish Church of Saint Anne in Buda (1686–1773 with interruption 1693–1723)
 Jesuit residence in Esztergom (1686–1773), now Christian Museum and 
 Jesuit college in Székesfehérvár (1688–1773), now  and 
 Candlemas Church of the Blessed Virgin Mary in the former Mosque of Pasha Qasim in Pécs (1699–1773)
 Jesuit college in Eger (1699–1773), now Géza Gárdonyi Cistsrcian School and 
 Jesuit college in Pest (1702–1773), now  and Inner City Parish Church 
  in Kalocsa (1860–1945)
  in Budapest (1888–1945 and since 1989)
 Saint Ignatius Jesuit College of Excellence in Budapest (since 1990)
 Fényi Gyula Jesuit High School in Miskolc (since 1994)

Ireland

 Jesuit schools in Limerick (1565–1773, with multiple interruptions), no longer extant
 Jesuit college in Galway (1620–1773, with multiple interruptions)
 Clongowes Wood College near Clane, County Kildare (since 1814)
 St Stanislaus College in Tullabeg, County Offaly (1818–1991)
 Church of Saint Francis Xavier in Dublin (since 1829)
 Belvedere College in Dublin (since 1832)
 Crescent College in Limerick (since 1859)
 Coláiste Iognáid (Ignatius College) and St Ignatius Church in Galway (since 1859)
 Milltown Institute of Theology and Philosophy in Dublin (1860–2015)
 Mungret College near Limerick (1882–1974)
 Emo Court in County Laois (1930–1969)
 Manresa House in Dublin (since 1948)
 Gonzaga College in Dublin (since 1950)
 St Declan's School in Dublin (since 1958)

Italy (outside Rome)

Mainland
 First Jesuit college in Venice (1550–1591)
 Jesuit college in Tivoli (c.1550–1773); church destroyed by bombing in 1944
 Jesuit college in Bologna (1551–1773), now  and Church of Santa Lucia 
 Jesuit college in Ferrara (1551–1773), now  and Church of the Gesù, the latter under Jesuit care again since 1814
 Jesuit college in Padua (1552–1591)
 Jesuit college in Genoa (1554–1773), now  
 Jesuit college in Frascati (1559–1773), now Church of the Gesù 
 Jesuit college in Macerata (1561–1773), now Istituto Storico della Resistenza e dell'Età Contemporanea "M. Morbiducci" and 
 Jesuit college in Parma (1564–1768), from 1599 University of Parma, now still a building of the university and Church of San Rocco
 Jesuit college in Turin (1566–1773), now Centro InformaGiovani and 
 Professed house in Milan (1567–1773), now Church of San Fedele
 Jesuit college in Brescia (1568–1606 and 1657–1773), now a school and 
 Jesuit college in Genoa (1569–1773), now University of Genoa and 
 College of the Brera in the Brera district of Milan (1571–1773), now Brera Academy, Pinacoteca di Brera, Biblioteca di Brera, and remains of the church of Santa Maria in Brera
 the Brera Astronomical Observatory was created there by the Jesuits in 1764
 Jesuit college in Lecce (1575–1767), now Administrative Tribunal of Apulia and Church of the Gesù
 Jesuit college in Verona (1578–1773 with interruption 1606–1656), now  and Church of San Sebastiano, the latter destroyed during World War II
  in Cerignola (1578–1767)
 Illyrian College in Loreto (1581–1593, 1624–1773, 1834–1860 and 1925–1942), now House of Pilgrims (Palazzo Illirico Casa accoglienza Pellegrini)
 Jesuit college in Piacenza (1583–1768), now Biblioteca Passerini-Landi and Church of San Pietro
  in Naples (1580s–1767), now Eleonora Pimentel Fonseca Lyceum and Church of the Gesù Nuovo 
 Jesuit college in Bari (1589–1767), now Church of the Holy Name of Jesus
 Jesuit college in Modena (1602–1773), now Istituto Istruzione Superiore Adolfo Venturi and Church of San Bartolomeo
 Jesuit college in Ancona (1605–1773), now 
 University of Fermo (1609–1773)
 Saint Ignatius College in Naples (1611–1767), now known as the 
 Jesuit college in Monopoli (1616–1767)
 Jesuit college in Gorizia (1615–1772), now 
 Church of Madonna della Piaggia in Spoleto (1621–1773)
 University of Mantua (1625–1630)
 Jesuit college in Trieste (1627–1773), now  
 Church of Saint Francis Xavier in Naples (1636–1767), now Church of San Ferdinando
 Jesuit complex in Venice (1657–1773), now university housing (Residenza Universitaria Gesuiti) and Church of Santa Maria Assunta ("I Gesuiti")
 Second Jesuit college in Padua (1663–1773)
 Church of San Giuseppe a Chiaia in Naples (1666–1767)
  in Turin (1679–1773), now Museo Egizio
  in Naples (18th century–1773, 1801–1806, 1827–1848, 1849–1860 and 1886–1922), initially as a facility of the Collegium Maximum and later as the first seat of Istituto Pontano; now abandoned
  in Colorno near Parma (1799–1806)
  in Chioggia (since 1814)
 Jesuit college in Spoleto (1826-?)
 Villa Mondragone in Frascati (1865–1981)
 Villa San Girolamo in Fiesole, temporary seat of the General Curia of the Jesuit Order (1873–1895)
 Social Institute in Turin (since 1881)
 Leo XIII Institute in Milan (since 1893)
  in Anagni (1897–1984)
  in Gallarate (since 1936)

Sardinia

 University of Sassari (1558–1765)
 Jesuit college in Cagliari (1564–1773), now Faculty of Architecture of University of Cagliari
 Novitiate in Cagliari (1584–1773), now a military hospital and

Sicily

 Jesuit College in Messina (1548–1767), generally considered the first Jesuit college, approved by Papal bull on 19 April 1550; destroyed in 1908 and replaced on the same ground by new facilities of the University of Messina
 The college church's portal was rebuilt on the grounds of the Interdisciplinary Regional Museum of Messina
 Professed house in Palermo (1549–1767), now  and Church of the Gesù
  in Catania (1555–1767), rebuilt 1698–1740 on the present site following the 1693 Sicily earthquake, now Art Institute (until 2009) and 
 Jesuit college in Syracuse (1555–1767), now offices of the Guardia di Finanza and Italian Revenue Agency and 
  in Bivona (1556–1767), now Town Hall and  
 Jesuit college in Caltabellotta (1558–1767)
 Jesuit college in Trapani (1580–1767), now  and 
 Collegium Maximum (second Jesuit house) in Palermo (1586–1767), now Biblioteca centrale della Regione Siciliana,  and 
  in Caltanissetta (1588–1767), now Biblioteca Scarabelli, Vincenzo Bellini Musical School, and 
 Jesuit college in Mineo (1588–1767), now office of the municipality and  
 Novitiate (third Jesuit house) in Palermo (1591–1767), now 
 Jesuit college in Modica (1630–1767), now  and 
 Fourth Jesuit house in Palermo (1633–1767), now buildings of University of Palermo (mostly rebuilt following World War II destructions) and Church of Saint Francis Xavier
 Jesuit college in Alcamo (1652–1773), now Museum of Contemporary Art, Church of the Holy Family and Church of the Gesù
  in Mazara del Vallo (1672–1767), now a cultural center
 Fifth Jesuit house or Casa di Sant'Ignazio al Molo in Palermo (1715–1767), now a school
 Jesuit college in Noto (1730–1767), now an arts venue and Church of San Carlo al Corso
 St. Ignatius College in Messina (since 1884)
 Gonzaga Institute in Palermo (since 1919)

Kosovo
 Loyola Gymnasium in Prizren (since 2005)

Latvia

  in Riga (1582–1621)
 St. James's Cathedral in Riga (1582–1621)
  in Cēsis (1582–1625), initially a residence until 1614
  in Daugavpils (1630–1811, with interruption 1656–1669), initially a residence until 1761, now Daugavpils fortress; college church destroyed during World War II
 Jesuit school in Izvalta (1635–1820), from 1817 a college, now 
 Jesuit residence in Skaistkalne (1660–1773), initially a mission until 1677, now 
 Jesuit college in Krāslava (1676–1811)
 Jesuit residence in Jelgava (1690–1773)
 Jesuit college in Ilūkste (1690–1773), initially a residence until 1761, destroyed during World War I
 Jesuit college in Dagda (1742–1820)
 Jesuit college in Puša, Rēzekne Municipality (1743–1820 and since 2006), now 
 Jesuit residence in Riga (1804–1820)

Lithuania

 Jesuit college in Vilnius (1570–1773), now Vilnius University, including the Astronomical Observatory started in 1753, and Church of Saint John
 Professed house in Vilnius (1604–1773, 1921–1939 and since 1995), now Vilnius Jesuit High School and Church of Saint Casimir
 Jesuit college in Kražiai (1616–1773), now a tourism office and elderly care center
 Jesuit novitiate in Vilnius (1622–1773), now  and Basilica of Saint Ignatius 
 Chapel of the House of Perkūnas in Kaunas (1643–1773)
 Jesuit college in Kaunas (1649–1820, 1923–1940 and since 1989), now Jesuit Gymnasium and Church of Saint Francis Xavier
 Jesuit college in Pašiaušė (1654–1773) named after Antonio Possevino (Collegium Possaviensis), now a ruined 
 Jesuit residence in Merkinė (1676–1773), now Merkinė Catholic Church
 Jesuit mission in Šeduva (1696–1762)
 Jesuit tertianship house in Vilnius (1697–1773), now offices of the Lithuanian Ministry of Culture's Heritage Department and Church of Saint Raphael Archangel

Luxembourg

 Jesuit college in Luxembourg City (1603–1773), now National Library of Luxembourg and Notre-Dame Cathedral; precursor to Athénée de Luxembourg high school

Malta
 Collegium Melitense in Valletta (1592–1768), now Valletta Campus of University of Malta and Church of the Jesuits
 Jesuit seminary in Gozo (1866–1909)
 Jesuit college in Villa St Ignatius in St. Julian's (1877–1906)
 St Aloysius' College in Birkirkara (since 1907)

Monaco
 Jesuit college in the former Convent of the Visitation (1862–1910), now Lycée Albert Premier
  (1926–1965), now a parish church

Netherlands

  in Maastricht (1575–1773, interrupted 1578–1579 and 1639–1673), now Jezuïetenhofje complex and  theater in the former college church
  in Amersfoort (since 1630), until 1715 a clandestine church
 De Krijtberg church in Amsterdam (since 1654, rebuilt 1881–1883), initially a clandestine church
 Church of Saint Peter Canisius in Nijmegen (since 1818)
 St. Willibrord College in Leiden (1831–1927), now Bonaventure College
 Catholic Comprehensive School in Breul near Zeist (1842–1980s), now known as De Breul
  in Maastricht (1853–1967), now School of Economics of Maastricht University
 Jesuit novitiate in Bleijenbeek Castle (1872–1900), in ruins since World War II
 Juniorate for German Jesuits at Wijnandsrade Castle in Wijnandsrade (1872–1910)
  quarries near Maastricht (1880–1967)
  in Groningen (1886–1962)
  in Valkenburg (1893–1940)
 Ignatius Gymnasium in Amsterdam (1895–1960s)
 Canisius College in Nijmegen (1900–2005)
 St Francis Xavier Church in Enkhuizen (since 1905), built on the site of a former clandestine church
  retreat center in Venlo (1908–1973), demolished around 2003
 Aloysius College in The Hague (1917–1970s)
  retreat center in Beekdaelen (1923–1969), now a center for asylum seekers
 Berchmanianum college and residence in Nijmegen (1928–2016)
 Maartenscollege in Groningen (1946–1992)
 Saint Stanislas College in Delft (since 1948), with  built 1955
  retreat center in Helvoirt (1965–1970s), now a conference hotel
  spirituality and cultural centre (since 1985), relocated in 2000 next to De Krijtberg

Poland

 Collegium Hosianum in Braniewo (1565–1773, with interruptions 1626–1637 and 1665–1668), now Jan Liszewski vocational school and 
 Jesuit college in Pułtusk (1566–1773), now  and 
  in Poznań (1572–1773), now City Hall and Basilica of Our Lady of Perpetual Help, Mary Magdalene and St. Stanislaus known as Fara Poznańska; precursor to Adam Mickiewicz University
 In the 1570s the college also took over the medieval Mary Magdalena School and  
  in Jarosław (1575–1773), now Stanisław Wyspiański School of Fine Arts and 
  in Lublin (1582–1773), now Archdiocesan Museum (including the ) and Cathedral of Saint John the Baptist
 Professed house in Kraków (1583–1773 and since 1908), now  and  
  in Kraków (1579–1732), demolished in 1802
  in Kalisz (1583–1773), now government offices and 
  in Kłodzko, Silesia (1597–1776), now  and Collegiate Church of the Assumption of the Virgin Mary
 Jesuit college in Sandomierz (1602–1773), now Collegium Gostomianum secondary school
  in Toruń (1605–1773, with interruptions 1606–1607, 1656–1659 and 1703–1709), now 
 Chapel of Malbork Castle (1607–1773)
 Jesuit Church in Warsaw (1609–1773 and since 1917)
 Jesuit college in Płock (1611–1773), now Marshal Stanisław Małachowski High School; in 1732 the Jesuits annexed the nearby Collegiate Church of Saint Michael
 Jesuit college in Krosno (1614–1783), demolished in the early 19th century
  in Bydgoszcz (1617–1780), now ; college church demolished by German occupation forces in early 1940
  in Gdańsk (1621–1773), now 
 Jesuit college in Nysa, Silesia (1622–1773), now 
 Jesuit college in Przemyśl (1626–1773), now a kindergarten and Cathedral of Saint John the Baptist; precursor to is
  in Reszel (1631–1773)
 Jesuit college in Drohiczyn (1657–1773), now a Major Seminary, seat of the diocese and 
 Święta Lipka Sanctuary in Święta Lipka (1688-late 18th century and since 1932)
 Jesuit mission in Żuromin (1718–1773)
 Jesuit college in Krasnystaw (1720–1780), now  and 
 Jesuit mission in Mazyr (c.1725–1773)
 Jesuit residence in Wschowa (1727–1773)
  in Nowy Sącz (since 1831)
  in Kraków (since 1867), now Jesuit University of Philosophy and Education Ignatianum and Basilica of the Sacred Heart of Jesus
 St. Stanislaus Jesuit High School in Gdynia (1937–1948 and since 1994)
  in Szczecin (since 1945)
  in Gdańsk (since 1945)
  in Gdańsk (1945–1990)
 Pedro Arrupe Training Center for Leaders and Educators in Warsaw (since 1997)

Portugal

 College of Jesus in Coimbra (1542–1759), now departments of Earth Sciences and Life Sciences of University of Coimbra and New Cathedral of Coimbra
  in Lisbon (1553–1759), now Hospital de São José
 Professed house in Lisbon (1553–1759 and 1829–1833), now the Santa Casa da Misericórdia,  and Church of São Roque
 College of Arts in Coimbra (1555–1759), adjacent to the Jesuit college, now Colégio das Artes of University of Coimbra 
 Jesuit college of the Holy Spirit in Évora (1559–1759 and 1829–1833), now part of University of Évora,  and Church of the Holy Spirit
 Jesuit college in Bragança (1561–1759), now Adrian Moreira municipal cultural center, music and dance school and Old Cathedral
 Jesuit college in Ponta Delgada, Azores (1568–1759), now Public Library, Regional Archive and Church of the Jesuit College 
 Jesuit college in Porto (1577–1759), now Major Seminary of Saint Lawrence and Igreja dos Grilos
 Jesuit college in Braga (1589–1759), now , Pius XII Museum, Medina Museum and Church of Saint Paul 
 Jesuit college in Funchal, Madeira (1599–1759), now rectorate of the University of Madeira and Church of Saint John the Evangelist
 Jesuit college in Angra do Heroísmo, Azores (1636–1759), now  and 
 Jesuit college in Santarém (1647–1759), now Episcopal Palace, seminary and Cathedral of Our Lady of the Assumption
  in Lisbon (1858–1910), now NOVA University Lisbon
  near Castelo Branco (1863–1910), buildings destroyed by fire in 2017
 Regional Centre of the Catholic University of Portugal in Braga (since 1947)
 St. John de Britto College in Lisbon (since 1947)
 Leigos para o Desenvolvimento in Lisbon (since 1986)

Romania

 Jesuit college in Oradea (1579–1606)
 Jesuit college in the Alba Carolina Citadel of Alba Iulia (1579–1588 and 1715–1776), now 1 Decembrie 1918 University
 Jesuit Academy of Kolozsvár in Cluj-Napoca (1581–1603 and 1698–1773), now Babeș-Bolyai University and Church of the Piarists; precursor to University of Szeged in Hungary
 Jesuit mission in Timișoara under Ottoman rule (1632–1653), later a mosque
 Jesuit college in Satu Mare (1634–1773), now Mihai Eminescu National College
 Jesuit college in Sibiu (1692–1773), now Jesuit Church; precursor to Gheorghe Lazăr National College
 Jesuit college in Târgu Mureș (1702–1773), now Church of Saint John the Baptist

Russia

 Jesuit college in Smolensk (mid-17th century)
 Jesuit school in Moscow (1687–1689 and 1698–1719)
 Church of Saint Catherine in Saint Petersburg (1800–1815) 
  in Saint Petersburg (1801–1815), now Museum of Emotions
 Jesuit missions in Saratov (1803–1820), Astrakhan (1805–1820), Mozdok (1806–1820), Irkutsk (1811–1820) and Tomsk (1815–1820)
 Saint Thomas Institute in Moscow (since 1997)

Serbia
 Jesuit mission in Belgrade under Ottoman rule (1612–1632)
  in Petrovaradin (1701–1773)

Slovakia

 First Jesuit college in Trnava (1561–1567)
 Jesuit college in Šaľa (1586–1773)
 Jesuit college in Kláštor pod Znievom (1589–1773, with interruption 1599–1609)
 Jesuit college in Bratislava (1628–1773) on the north side of St Martin's Cathedral, now faculty of theology of Comenius University
  in Trnava (1635–1773), now University of Trnava and Cathedral of Saint John the Baptist; precursor to Eötvös Loránd University in Budapest
  of Skalka nad Váhom (1644–1773)
 Jesuit college in Banská Bystrica (1647–1773), now Cathedral of Saint Francis Xavier
 Church of the Holy Trinity in Košice (1671–1773)
 Jesuit Church in Bratislava (1672–1773)
 Church of Saint Francis Xavier in Skalica (1693–1773)

Slovenia

 Former Pleterje Charterhouse near Šentjernej (1591–1773)
 Former charterhouse in Jurklošter (1595–1773)
 Jesuit college in Ljubljana (1597–1773), now Special Education Centre Janez Levec and Parish Church of Saint James
 Jesuit college in Maribor (1757–1773), now regional and Archdiocesan archives and

Spain

 Sanctuary of Loyola in Azpeitia, Gipuzkoa (since 1682, with multiple interruptions between 1767 and 1885), birthplace of Ignatius of Loyola in 1491
 Castle of Xavier in Javier, Navarre (since c.1901), birthplace of Francis Xavier in 1506
 Cave of Saint Ignatius in Manresa, Catalonia (since 1603, presumably with interruptions), where Ignatius stayed in 1522–23
 Jesuit college in Alcalá de Henares (1545–1767), now , and 
 Jesuit college of Saint Anthony, later (1609) of Saint Ignatius in Valladolid (1545–1767), now 
  in Gandia (1548–1767), now 
  in Sevilla (1554–1767), now 
 Jesuit college in Córdoba (1555–1767), now Colegio La Inmaculada and 
  in Murcia (1555–1767), now the seat of the President of the Region of Murcia and Iglesia-Museo de San Esteban
 College of the Incarnation in Marchena (1556-1767), now 
 Jesuit college in Zaragoza (1558–1767), now  and  
  in Loranca de Tajuña (1558–1767)
 Jesuit college in Segovia (1559–1767), now  and 
 Jesuit college in Palma de Mallorca (1561–1767, 1824–1837 and since 1919), now Our Lady of Mount Zion College 
 College of Saint Paul in Valencia (1562–1767), now  including the 
  in Trigueros near Huelva (1563–1767)
 Professed House in Seville (1565–1767), now Faculty of Arts of University of Seville and  
  in Montilla (1568–1767 and since 1944)
  in Toledo (1569–1767), now offices of the Ministry of Finance and Church of San Idelfonso, the latter again under Jesuit care since 1937
 Colegio Imperial de Madrid, after 1625 Reales Estudios de San Isidro in Madrid (1569–1767), now IES San Isidro and Colegiata de San Isidro
 Jesuit college in Málaga (1572–1767), now a school and 
 Jesuit college in Oviedo (1576–1767), now Church of Saint Isidore; other college buildings demolished in 1873, now 
 Jesuit college in Arévalo (1579–1767), now 
 Jesuit novitiate in Villagarcía de Campos (1580–1767), now a museum and 
 Jesuit college in Santander (c.1580–1767), now offices of the Justice Ministry and 
 Jesuit college in Palencia (1584–1767), now diocesan seat, major seminary and 
 Jesuit college for English students in Valladolid (1590–1767), now Royal English College of Saint Alban
 English College of St Gregory in Seville (1592–1767), now  and Church of Saint Gregory
 Jesuit college in Monforte de Lemos near Lugo (1593–1767), now Colegio Nuestra Senora de la Antigua
  in Bergara (1593–1767), now office of National University of Distance Education and Colegio Aranzadi school
 College of Saint Paul in Granada (?–1767), now  and Church of Saints Justus and Pastor
 Jesuit college in Tudela (1600–1767), now Official Language School and office of National University of Distance Education 
 Jesuit novitiate in Madrid (1602–1767), now part of Complutense University
 Jesuit college in Andújar, Andalusia (1606–1767), now 
 New Jesuit novitiate in Seville (1609–1767), now Church of Saint Louis of France 
  in Valladolid (1610–1767), now Diocesan house and 
 Jesuit college of the Holy Spirit in Salamanca (1611–1767), now Pontifical University of Salamanca and 
 Jesuit residence on calle del Prado and church of Santa María del Prado in Madrid (1617–1627)
 College of Saint Theodemir in Carmona (1619-1767), now City Hall and 
  and church of Saint Francis Borgia, north of the Plaza Mayor in Madrid (1627–1767), demolished in 1837
 Jesuit college in Alicante (1629–1767), now 
 Jesuit college in Graus (1651–1767, 1815–1820 and 1868–1873), now Espacio Pirineos
  in Barcelona (1662–1767), later rebuilt as 
 Church of San Lorenzo el Real in Burgos (1684–1767)
  Jesuit college in Cáceres (1692–1767), now Escuela Superior de Arte Dramático and 
  in Madrid (1725–1767 and 1827–1830s), destroyed by fire in 1889
 Convento de San Marcos in León (1859–1868)
  in Murcia (since 1871, with interruption in the 1930s)
 St. James the Apostle College in Vigo (since 1872, with interruption in the 1930s)
 College of the Savior in Zaragoza (since 1877, with interruption in the 1930s)
 Veruela Abbey, Province of Zaragoza (1877–1973, with interruption 1932–1939)
  in Barcelona (1878–1895)
 Our Lady of Remembrance College in Madrid (since 1880, with interruption in the 1930s)
 Monastery of San Salvador in Oña (1880–1967, with interruption 1932–1937)
 Col·legi Casp in Barcelona (since 1881, with interruption 1932–1939)
 College of Saint Joseph in Valladolid (since 1881, with interruption 1932–1936)
 St. Stanislaus Kostka College in Málaga (since 1882, with interruption in the 1930s)
 San Jose College in Durango (since 1885, with interruption in the 1930s)
 University of Deusto in Bilbao (since 1886, with interruption 1932–1940)
 Residence on calle Isabel la Católica and Church of the Sacred Heart and Saint Francis Borgia on calle de la Flor in Madrid (1887–1931), from 1911 professed house, destroyed by arson on 12 May 1931
 Colegio de la Inmaculada in Gijón (since 1890, with interruption during the Spanish Civil War)
 Francis Borgia College in the Ducal Palace of Gandia (since 1890, with interruption in the 1930s), birthplace of Francis Borgia
 Xavier College in Tudela (since 1891, with interruption 1932–1936)
 St. Ignatius College in Barcelona (since 1892, with interruption in the 1930s)
 College of San Jose in Villafranca de los Barros, Extremadura (since 1893, with interruption in the 1930s)
 Ebro Observatory in Roquetas (since 1904, with interruption in the 1930s)
 Chemical Institute of Sarrià, Barcelona (1905–1984, with interruption 1932–1939)
 San Jose Secondary Educational Center in Málaga (since 1906, with interruption in the 1930s)
 San Jose Schools in Valencia (since 1908, with interruption in the 1930s)
 Royal Monastery of Santa María de Oia in Galicia (1910–1932)
 St. Ignatius College in Oviedo (since 1917, with interruption in the 1930s)
 St. Ignatius of Loyola College in Las Palmas, Gran Canaria (since 1917, with interruption in the 1930s)
 Our Lady of Begoña College in Bilbao (since 1921, with interruption in the 1930s)
  in Barcelona (since 1923)
 Vocational Training Centre Revillagigedo in Gijón (since 1929, with interruption in the 1930s)
 St. Ignatius College in San Sebastián (since 1929, with interruption in the 1930s)
 Cristo Rey Polytechnic Institute in Valladolid (since 1939)
 Kostka College in Barcelona (since 1939)
  (SAFA) schools in various cities (since 1940)
 Holy Family University Center in Úbeda (since 1941)
 Jesus the Worker polytechnic institute in Vitoria-Gasteiz (since 1942)
 St. Ignatius College in Pamplona (since 1946)
 Immaculate Heart of Mary College, Portaceli in Seville (since 1950)
 St. Stanislaus Kostka College in Salamanca (since 1952)
 St. Ignatius of Loyola College in Alcalá de Henares (since 1953)
 College of the Immaculate in Alicante (since 1954)
 University of Deusto campus in San Sebastián (since 1956)
 St. Francis Xavier School in Burgos (since 1956)
 Nazareth College in Alicante (since 1957)
 Sacred Heart School in Logroño (since 1957)
  in Seville (since 1957)
 ESADE in Barcelona, consisting of ESADE Business School (since 1958) and ESADE Law School (since 1992) 
 Sacred Heart Jesuit School in León (since 1959)
 Kostka College in Santander (since 1960)
 Xavier College in Santiago de Compostela (since 1961)
 Virgin of Guadalupe College in Badajoz (since 1962)
  in Córdoba (since 1963), now part of Loyola University Andalusia
 St. Mary of the Sea College in A Coruña (since 1964)
 University of Agricultural Engineering in Valladolid (since 1964)
  (1966–2014)
 Saint Louis University Madrid Campus (since 1967)
 John XXIII School, Bellvitge in L'Hospitalet de Llobregat near Barcelona (since 1968)
 Comillas Pontifical University in Madrid (since 1969), following relocation from Comillas
  in Madrid (since 1969)
 Claver College, Raimat in Lleida (since 1970)
 Entreculturas in Madrid (since 1985)
 ALBOAN in Vitoria-Gasteiz (since 1996)
 Loyola University Andalusia in Seville (since 2010)

Sweden
 St. Eugenia's Church in Stockholm (since 1860), at the present location facing Kungsträdgården since 1982
 Newman Institute in Uppsala (since 2001)

Switzerland

 Jesuit college in Lucerne (1574–1773 and 1844–1847), now seat of the Canton of Lucerne and Jesuit Church 
 Jesuit college in Porrentruy (1591–1773), now 
 Jesuit college in Bellinzona (1646–1675)
 Jesuit college in Brig (1662–1773 and 1814–1847), now 
 Jesuit college in Sion (1734–1773 and 1814–1847), now Church of the Jesuits
 Jesuit school in Estavayer-le-Lac (1827–1847)
 Jesuit school in Schwyz (1836–1847)
  in Menzingen (since 1929)
 Jesuit center of Notre-Dame-de-la-Route in Villars-sur-Glâne near Fribourg (since 1959)

Ukraine

  in Lutsk (1606–1773), now National University of Food Technologies and Catholic Cathedral of Saints Peter and Paul
  in Lviv (1608–1773, 1820–1848 and 1852–1946), now School #62 and Greek Catholic Church of Saints Peter and Paul; precursor to the University of Lviv
 Jesuit college in Kamianets-Podilskyi (1611–1773, with interruption 1672–1699), now Faculty of History of Kamyanets-Podilsky Ivan Ohienko National University; the college church of Saint Stanislaus was demolished in 1833
 Jesuit college in Bar (c.1614–1773), later a Carmelite monastery
  in Ostroh (1624–1773);  and other buildings destroyed by fire in the 19th century
 Jesuit college in Ovruch (1670s–1773), church rebuilt in 2001 as 
 Jesuit college in Sambir (c.1700–1773), now 
 Jesuit college in Zhytomyr (1724–1773), now in ruins known as the  
  in Ivano-Frankivsk (1728–1773), later , now Faculty of Anatomy of Ivano-Frankivsk National Medical University and Greek Catholic Cathedral of the Resurrection
 Jesuit residence in Volodymyr-Volynskyi (1718–1773), now 
  in Kremenets (1750–1773), now  and Orthodox Church of the Transfiguration
 Jesuit mission in Odessa (1804–1820)
  in Ternopil (1820–1848 and 1852–1886), now Greek Catholic Cathedral of the Immaculate Conception
 Jesuit school in Khyriv (1886–1939), since 1996 chapel reconsecrated as Greek Catholic Church of Saint Nicholas. Estate now under redevelopment
 Church of Saint Stanislaus Kostka in Ivano-Frankivsk (1893–1939), now 
  in Kolomyia (1895–1946), now Greek Catholic 
  in Ternopil (1899–1945); some architectonic elements kept in post-World War II commercial building
 Jesuit monastery in Hnizdychiv (1931–1939), now a Redemptorist monastery
 Eastern Catholic Jesuit seminary at the former Bernardine monastery in Dubno (1931–1939)

United Kingdom

England
 Jesuit college at Savoy Palace, London (1687–1688)
 Jesuit college in Fenchurch Street, London (1687–1688)
 St Joseph's School, Hurst Green, Lancashire (since 1688)
 St Mary's Chapel, Friargate, Preston (1763–1990)
 Our Lady Help of Christians Church, Portico, Merseyside (1790–1900s)
 St Mary on the Quay, Bristol (1790–1996)
 St Wilfrid's Church in Preston, Lancashire (since 1792)
 Stonyhurst College in Lancashire (since 1794)
 St Michael and St John Church, Clitheroe (1799–2008)
 Hodder Place, Stonyhurst (1803–1970)
 St Mary's Church, Clayton-le-Moors (1810–1873)
 St John's Church, Wigan  (1819–1933)
 St Austin's Church, Wakefield (1827–1931)
 St George's Church, Worcester (1829–1990)
 Saint Ignatius Church in Preston, Lancashire (1833–2001), now Syro-Malabar Cathedral of St Alphonsa 
 St Francis Xavier Church, Hereford (1837–1858)
 St Edmund's Church, Bury St Edmunds (1837–1900s)
 St Stephen's Church, Skipton (1842–1914)
 St Francis Xavier's College in Liverpool (1842–1974)
 St Francis Xavier Church in Liverpool (since 1842)
 Mount St Mary's College in Spinkhill, Derbyshire (since 1842)
 Church of the Immaculate Conception, Farm Street in London (since 1843)
 Church of the Immaculate Conception, Spinkhill, Derbyshire (1844–2000s)
 Church of St Walburge, Preston (1847–1900s)
 St Mary's Church, Great Yarmouth (1850–1962)
 Annunciation Church, Chesterfield (1854–1900s)
 St Joseph's Roman Catholic Church, Leigh, Greater Manchester (1855–1900s)
 Our Lady Immaculate and St Joseph Church, Prescot, Merseyside (1856–1932)
 Sacred Heart Church, Blackpool (1857–2004)
 Holy Cross Church, St Helens (1860–1933)
 Parkstead House in London (1861–1962)
 Beaumont College, Old Windsor, (1861–1967)
 Preston Catholic College, (1863–1978)
 Our Lady Star of the Sea Church, Lowestoft (1867–1882)
 St Joseph and St Francis Xavier Church, (1868–1962)
 Sacred Heart Church, Accrington (1869–1958)
 Sacred Heart Church, Bournemouth (1870–1969)
 Church of the Holy Name of Jesus in Manchester (1871–1985, 2013–)
 Ditton Hall Jesuit community in Ditton, Cheshire (1872–1895), now St Michael's Church
 Oxford Oratory in Oxford (1875–1990)
 St Ignatius Church, South Ossett, Wakefield, (1877–1910)
 Sacred Heart Church in Wimbledon, London (1877–2012)
 Wimbledon College, established next to the church in 1892
 Donhead Preparatory School, created nearby in 1933
 St Winefride Church, South Wimbledon, a chapel of Sacred Heart Church (1905–1962)
 Christ the King Church, Wimbledon Park (founded 1913, construction completed 1926)
 Jesuit Missions UK, present on the same street
 St Joseph Church, Roehampton (1881–1948)
 Corpus Christi Church, Brixton, London (1887–2005)
 St John's Beaumont School in Old Windsor (since 1888)
 Jesuit presbytery in London (since 1888), now London Jesuit Centre
 St Ignatius Church, Stamford Hill in London (since 1894)
 St Ignatius' College in Enfield, London (since 1894)
 Corpus Christi Church, Boscombe near Bournemouth (since 1895)
 Campion Hall in Oxford (since 1896)
 St Michael's College, Leeds (1905–2008)
 Sacred Heart Church, Leeds (1905–1947)
 Campion House in Osterley, West London (1911–2004)
 Holy Trinity Church, Chipping Norton (1922–1969)
 Oakwood House retreat centre, Romiley, Stockport, moved to Rainhill Hall in 1923
 Rainhill Hall or Loyola Hall retreat centre in Rainhill, Merseyside (1923–2014)
 Church of St Mary, Lowe House, St Helens (1924–1981)
 Heythrop Park in Oxfordshire (1926–1970)
 Our Lady of Lourdes Church, Leeds (1930–1947)
 Corby Hall retreat centre, Sunderland (1933–1973)
 St Aidan's Catholic Academy, Sunderland (1935–1948)
 St Peter's Catholic School, Bournemouth (1936–1947)
 Barlborough Hall School, Spinkhill (since 1939)
 Loyola Preparatory School, Buckhurst Hill, Essex (1944–2001)
 St Mary's Hall, Stonyhurst (since 1946)
 Harlaxton Manor, novitiate, Lincolnshire (1948–1965)
 Southwell House, Fitzjohn's Avenue, Hampstead, London (1950–2009)
 St Aloysius' College Junior School, Glasgow (since 1954)
 Campion School, Hornchurch (1962–1965)
 Heythrop College, University of London in London (1971–2018)
 Jesuit Refugee Service, Wapping, London (since 1980s)
 St Anselm's Church, Southall in London (since 2001)
 Oxford University Catholic Chaplaincy (since 2007)

Scotland

 Jesuit college at Holyrood Palace in Edinburgh (1687–1688)
 St David's Church, Dalkeith (1854–1944)
 St Aloysius' College and St Aloysius Church in Glasgow (since 1859)
 Catholic Church of the Sacred Heart of Jesus in Edinburgh (since 1860)
 Craighead House, Blantyre, South Lanarkshire (early 1900s to 2000)
 Woodhall House, Edinburgh (1959–1970)
 Acre House, Glasgow (1965–1977)

Wales
 Welsh Jesuit College of St Francis Xavier at Cwm, Llanrothal (1622–1678)
 St Winefride's Church, Holywell (1832–1900s)
 St Beuno's Ignatian Spirituality Centre in Tremeirchion (since 1847)
 Our Lady of the Assumption Church, Rhyl (1863–1900s)
 Our Lady of Ransom and the Holy Souls Church, Llandrindod Wells (opened 1907)

Jersey
 Maison Saint Louis college in Saint Saviour near Saint Helier (1880–1954), now a hotel 
 Naval training school in Saint Saviour (1894-c.1920), now Highlands College

Americas

Argentina

 Jesuit College on the "Illuminated Block" (Manzana de las Luces) in Buenos Aires (1608–1767), now Colegio Nacional de Buenos Aires, Faculty of Law of University of Buenos Aires, and Church of Saint Ignatius
 Collegium Maximum on the "Jesuit Block" (Manzana Jesuitica) in Córdoba (1610–1767), now National University of Córdoba, Colegio Nacional de Monserrat, and Lourdes Chapel
 17th-century Jesuit reductions in Misiones Province: 
 Mission of Nuestra Señora de Loreto (1610–1767)
  (1619–1767)
  (1622–1767, with interruptions)
 Mission of Santa María la Mayor (1626–1767)
  (1627–1665)
  (1629–1767)
  (1630–1767)
  (1631–1767)
  (1632–1767, with interruptions)
  (1632–1767, with interruptions)
 Mission of Nuestra Señora de Santa Ana (1633–1767)
  (1633–1767, with interruptions)
  (1639–1767, with interruptions)
 Mission of San Ignacio Miní (1696–1767)
 Jesuit estancias around Córdoba: 
  (1616–1767)
  (1618–1767)
  (1622–1767)
  (1643–1767)
  (1683–1767)
  (1683–1767)
  (1720–1767)
  (1726–1767)
  in Yapeyú, Corrientes (1627–1767)
 Mission of Nahuel Huapi in Patagonia (1670–1767, with interruptions)
  in Southern Buenos Aires Province (1740–1753)
  at Resistencia, Chaco (1750–1767)
 Colegio del Salvador in Buenos Aires (since 1868)
 Facultades de Filosofía y Teología de San Miguel near Buenos Aires (since 1918); initially in Santa Fe, moved to San Miguel in 1923
  (since 1931)
 Colegio Máximo de San José in Buenos Aires (since 1931)
 Catholic University in Córdoba (since 1956)
 Universidad del Salvador in Buenos Aires (since 1958)

Belize
 St. Peter Claver Catholic parish in Punta Gorda (since 1862)
 St. John's College in Belize City (since 1887)
 St. Martin de Porres Church in Belize City (since 1968)

Bolivia

 Jesuit college in Potosí (1577–1767), now 1 April School and  
 Jesuit college in La Plata, now Sucre (1621–1767), now University of Saint Francis Xavier, Church of Saint Michael and 
 Jesuit Missions of Chiquitos in Santa Cruz Department (dates refer to the establishment on the present location; see also the list of missions): 
 Mission of San José de Chiquitos (1698–1767)
 Mission of San Javier (1708–1767)
 Mission of San Rafael de Velasco (1719–1767)
 Mission of San Miguel de Velasco (1721–1767)
 Mission of the Immaculate Conception in Concepción (1722–1767)
 Mission of Santa Ana de Velasco (1755–1767)
 Mission of San Ignacio de Velasco
 Mission of San Ignacio de Zamucos (1724–1745)
 Mission of Santo Corazón
 Mission of Santiago de Chiquitos
 Mission of San Juan Bautista
 Jesuit Missions of Moxos in Beni Department
 Jesuit college in Trinidad (1686–1767), now Apostolic Vicariate of El Beni and Cathedral of the Holy Trinity
 Loreto Mission
 San Ignacio de Moxos Mission
 San Javier Mission
 Santos Reyes Mission
 Exaltación Mission
 San Joaquín Mission
 Santa Ana del Yacuma Mission
 Santa Magdalena
 Jesuit mission of San Borja (1693–1767)
 Jesuit college in Tarija (1690–1767), now Colegio Nacional San Luis and Cathedral of Saint Bernard
 Colegio San Calixto in La Paz (since 1882)
 Colegio del Sagrado Corazón, Sucre (since 1912)
 Radio Fides in La Paz (since 1939)
 Colegio San Ignacio, La Paz (since 1963)
 Loyola Cultural Action Foundation in Sucre (since 1966)
 Center for Research and Promotion of Farmers in La Paz (since 1970)
 John XXIII College, Cochabamba (since 1971)
 Centre for Research and Popular Service in Oruro, Bolivia (since 1984)
 Luis Espinal Higher Institute of Philosophy and Humanities in Cochabamba (since 2003)

Brazil

 Jesuit college in Vitória, Espírito Santo (1551–1759), now Anchieta Palace
  facing Terreiro de Jesus in Salvador, Bahia (1553–1759), its former chapel now the Cathedral Basilica of Salvador and the  built on the remains of the school
 Pátio do Colégio in São Paulo dos Campos de Piratininga, São Paulo (1554–1640, 1653–1759 and since 1953), now  and Basilica of Joseph of Anchieta
 Chapel of Saint Michael Archangel in São Miguel Arcanjo, São Paulo (1560–1759)
 Jesuit college in Olinda, Pernambuco (1565-1759), now 
 Jesuit college on Castle Hill in Rio de Janeiro (1567–1759); the entire hill, including the college's remains, was leveled in the 1920s
  in Anchieta, Espírito Santo (1579–1759 and since 1928)
 Tejupeba House and the Chapel of the Colégio Sugar Plantation, a Jesuit slave-holding plantation (ca. 1601)
 Jesuit college in São Luís, Maranhão (1622–1759), nolouis w Corregedor-Geral da Justiça do Maranhão and Catedral de São Luís
 Church of Our Lady of the Assumption in Viçosa do Ceará (1665–1759)
 Misiones Orientales in Rio Grande do Sul, developed from the late 17th century until the Guaraní War
 Mission of São Miguel (1687–1754)
  (1687–1754)
  (1690–1754)
 Former Jesuit House of Prayer, Salvador (circa 1696)
  (1697–1754)
 St. Louis College in São Paulo (since 1867)
 Anchieta College in Nova Friburgo (since 1886)
 Anchieta College in Porto Alegre (since 1890)
 St. Ignatius College in Rio de Janeiro (since 1903)
 Saint Catherine College in Florianópolis (since 1905)
 Antonio Vieira College in Salvador, Bahia (since 1911)
 Diocesan College in Teresina (since 1925)
 St. Francis Xavier College in São Paulo (since 1926)
 Pontifical Catholic University in Rio de Janeiro (since 1941)
 Centro Universitário da FEI in São Bernardo do Campo near São Paulo (since 1941)
 Catholic University of Pernambuco in Recife (since 1943)
 Loyola College in Belo Horizonte (since 1943)
 St. Ignatius College in Fortaleza (since 1955)
 Jesuit College in Juiz de Fora, Minas Gerais (since 1956)
 College of Our Lady Mediatrix in Curitiba (since 1957)
 FMC Electronic Technical School in Santa Rita do Sapucaí, Minas Gerais (since 1963)
 St. Alphonsus Rodriguez School in Teresina (since 1963)
 Center for Studies and Social Action in Salvador, Bahia (since 1967)
 Unisinos University in São Leopoldo (since 1969)
 Jesuit School of Philosophy and Theology in Belo Horizonte (since 1982), initially founded in Nova Friburgo in 1941 
 Padre Arrupe School in Teresina (since 2003)

Canada

 Jesuit college in Quebec City (1635–1800)
 The college buildings were demolished in 1878. It is now the site of the City Hall of Quebec City
 Séminaire de Québec, created in 1637 as a boarding house for college's students 
 Sainte-Marie among the Hurons mission near Midland, Ontario (1639–49)
 Jesuit mission at Old Sandwich Town (1747-late 18th century)
 Jesuit Chapel in Quebec City (since 1818)
 Holy Cross Church, Wiikwemkoong in Northern Ontario (1844–1954)
 Jesuit mission in Walpole Island (1844–1850)
 Collège Sainte-Marie in Montreal (1848–1969)
 The college was merged in 1969 to form Université du Québec à Montréal. Its buildings were demolished in 1975
 The Church of the Gesù (Montreal), built 1864–1865, was preserved and renovated in 1983
 Saint Sylvesters Church in Red Rock Indian Band, Ontario (since 1852)
 St. Andrew's Church in Thunder Bay, Ontario (1872–1997)
 Villa Manresa, now Manresa Spirituality Centre in Quebec City (since 1891)
 Loyola College, originally the English-speaking program of Collège Sainte-Marie in Montréal, later merged into Concordia University (1896–1974)
 St. Ignatius Church in Winnipeg (since 1908), and St. Ignatius School since 1911
 Villa Saint Martin in Montreal (since 1910), since 1953 in the current building
 Ignatius Jesuit Centre in Guelph, Ontario (since 1913); Loyola House moved there from Glen Abbey in 1964
 Campion College in Regina, Saskatchewan (since 1917)
 Manresa Jesuit Spiritual Renewal Centre in Pickering, Ontario (since 1924)
 St. Charles Garnier College in Quebec City (since 1930)
 Regis College in Toronto (since 1930)
 St. Paul's College in Winnipeg (since 1933)
 Camp Ekon in Ontario (since 1937)
 Saint Mary's University in Halifax, Nova Scotia (1940–1970)
 Glen Abbey retreat and training center in Oakville, Ontario (1953–1963), now Glen Abbey Golf Course
 Gonzaga High School in St. John's, Newfoundland and Labrador (since 1962), and St. Pius X Church built in the 1970s
 Villa Loyola in Greater Sudbury, Ontario (since 1962)
 Brebeuf College School in Toronto (since 1963)
 Loyola High School in Montreal (since 1964), earlier part of Loyola College, and St. Ignatius of Loyola Church built in 1966
 Our Lady of Lourdes Church in Toronto (since 1969)
 Anishinabe Spiritual Centre in Espanola, Ontario (since 1972)
 Jesuit Forum for Social Faith and Justice in Toronto (since 1979)
 Centre justice et foi in Montreal (since 1983)
 Saint Bonaventure's College in St. John's (since 1999)
 Holy Rosary Church in Guelph (since 2001)
 St. Patrick's Church in Halifax (since 2005)
 St. Mark's Church in Vancouver (since 2007)

Chile

 Church of Quinchao in the Chiloé Archipelago (1605–1767) 
 Jesuit college in Valparaíso (1659–1767), demolished in 1879
  in Calera de Tango (1685–1767)
 Church of Santa María de Loreto, Achao in the Chiloé Archipelago (1754–1767)
  in Graneros (1758–1767)
 Mission of Río Bueno in Río Bueno (1767)
  in Valparaíso (since 1852)
 St. Ignatius College in Santiago (since 1854) 
 Iglesia de San Ignacio (Santiago de Chile) in Santiago (since 1867)
 St. Francis Xavier College in Puerto Montt (since 1859)
  in Puerto Montt (since 1871)
 St. Ignatius El Bosque in Santiago (since 1935)
 St. Aloysius College in Antofagasta (since 1936)
 Hogar de Cristo in Santiago (since 1944)
 University of Valparaíso in Valparaíso (1951–1963)
 St. Matthew College in Osorno (since 1959)
 Infocap in Santiago (since 1984)
 Alberto Hurtado University in Santiago (since 1997)
 Misión Jesuita Mapuche

Colombia

 Collegium Maximum in Bogotá (1604–1767, 1844–1850, 1859–1861, and since 1887), now  and 
 Jesuit college in Cartagena (1604–1767), now Museo Naval del Caribe and Church of Saint Peter Claver, the latter under Jesuit management again since 1896
  in Tunja (1620–1767)
 Church of San José in Popayán (1702–1767)
 St. Ignatius Loyola College in Medellín (since 1885), located at  until 1957, and 
 Colegio San Pedro Claver in Bucaramanga (since 1886)
 St. Joseph College in Barranquilla (since 1918)
 St. Francis Xavier College in Pasto (since 1925)
 Pontifical Xavierian University in Bogotá (since 1930), with a second campus in Cali since 1970
 Berchmans College in Cali (since 1933)
 Colegio San Bartolomé La Merced in Bogotá (since 1941)
 St. Aloysius Gonzaga College in Manizales (since 1954)
 Fe y Alegría in Bogotá (since 1955)
 Instituto Mayor Campesino in Buga, Valle del Cauca (since 1962)
 CINEP / Peace Program in Bogotá (since 1972)
 Gimnasio Los Caobos in Chía near Bogotá (since 1991)

Cuba

 Jesuit college of San José in Havana (1721–1767), now Feria de la Artesania and Havana Cathedral
 Colegio de Belén in Havana (1854–1961), now Instituto Técnico Militar 
 Colegio de Nuestra Señora de Monserrat in Cienfuegos (1879–1942)
 College of Dolores in Santiago de Cuba (1913–1961)

Dominican Republic

 Jesuit college of Saint Ignatius in Santo Domingo (1683–1767), now Centro de Altos Estudios Humanísticos y del Idioma Español and National Pantheon of the Dominican Republic
 Loyola Polytechnic Institute in San Cristóbal (since 1952)
 Pedro Francisco Bono Institute in Santo Domingo (since 1985)

Ecuador

 Jesuit college in Quito (1605–1767), now Metropolitan Cultural Center and Church of the Jesuits; precursor to Central University of Ecuador
 Jesuit college in Cuenca (1638–1767)
 School of Saint Philip Neri in Riobamba (since 1838)
 St. Gabriel College in Quito (since 1862)
 Christ the King School in Portoviejo (since 1930)
 Borja School in Cuenca (since 1937)
 Pontifical Catholic University of Ecuador in Quito (since 1946)
 Unidad Educativa Javier in Guayaquil (since 1956)
 Working Boy Center in Quito (since 1964)
 Hogar de Cristo in Guayaquil (since 1971)

France (overseas)

  in French Guiana (1668–1764), now an archaeological park

El Salvador
 Externado San José in San Salvador (since 1921)
 Central American University in San Salvador (since 1965)

Guatemala

  in Antigua Guatemala (1606–1767), now a center of the Spanish Agency for International Development Cooperation and ruined church
 Trentin School in Guatemala City (1851–1872)
 Xavier Lyceum in Guatemala City (since 1952)
 Loyola College Guatemala in Guatemala City (since 1958)
 Rafael Landívar University on several campuses in Guatemala (since 1961)

Guyana
 Sacred Heart Church in Georgetown (1857–2004), destroyed by fire
 St. Stanislaus College in Georgetown (1866–1980)

Haiti
 Jesuit house in Cap-Haïtien (1705–1763), serving parishes in Limonade, Trou-du-Nord, Fort-Liberté, Terrier-Rouge, Port-Margot, Limbé, Dondon, Ouanaminthe, Plaisance & Pilate, and Borgne
 Villa Manrèse center in Port-au-Prince (1959–1964), destroyed in the 2010 Haiti earthquake

Honduras
 Radio Progreso & ERIC-SJ in El Progreso (since 1980)

Jamaica
 St. George's College in Kingston (since 1950)
 Campion College in Kingston (since 1960)

Mexico

 Professed house in Mexico City (1578–1767), now  and Church of San Felipe Neri "La Profesa"
 Jesuit college in Puebla (1580–1767), now Meritorious Autonomous University of Puebla and Church of La Compañía
 College of Saint Gregory for Native Mexicans in Mexico City (1586–1767), adjacent to the College of Saint Peter and Saint Paul, now 
 College of Saint Ildefonsus boarding school in Mexico City (1588–1767), now a museum and cultural center of the same name, and Museum of Light in the complex's eastern wing; precursor to Escuela Nacional Preparatoria
 Jesuit mission in San Luis de la Paz (from 1590)
 Jesuit college of Saint Thomas Aquinas in Guadalajara (1591–1767), now 
 Jesuit college in San Luis Potosí (1624–1767), now Universidad Autónoma de San Luis Potosí and 
 Jesuit colleges of Saint Ignatius and Saint Francis Xavier in Querétaro City (1625–1767), now Faculty of Philosophy of Autonomous University of Queretaro and Parish church of Santiago 
 Jesuit missions in Sonora and Chihuaha: 
 Mission of Cuquiárachi in Fronteras (1645–1767)
 Mission in Arizpe (1646–1767)
 Mission of San Francisco de Borja in Chihuahua (1645–1767)
 Mission Nuestra Señora de los Dolores near Cucurpe (1687–1744)
 Mission San Pedro y San Pablo in Tubutama (1687–1767)
 Mission Santa Teresa in Atil (1687–1767)
 Jesuit college in Morelia (1660–1767), now ,  and 
 Jesuit missions in Baja California: 
 Misión San Bruno near Loreto (1684–1685)
 Misión de Nuestra Señora de Loreto Conchó in Loreto (1697–1767)
 Visita de San Juan Bautista Londó near Loreto (1699–1767)
 Misión San Javier near Loreto (1699–1767)
 Misión San Juan Bautista Malibat near Loreto (1705–1767)
 Misión Santa Rosalía in Mulegé (1705–1767)
 Misión San Jose de Comondú near Loreto (1708–1767)
 Misión La Purísima Concepción de Cadegomó near Loreto (1720–1767)
 Misión de Nuestra Señora del Pilar de La Paz Airapí in La Paz (1720–1767)
 Misión Nuestra Señora de Guadalupe de Huasinapi near Mulegé (1720–1767)
 Misión Santiago de Los Coras near San José del Cabo (1721–1767)
 Misión Nuestra Señora de los Dolores del Sur Chillá between Loreto and La Paz (1721–1767)
 Misión San Ignacio Kadakaamán in San Ignacio (1728–1767)
 Misión Estero de las Palmas de San José del Cabo Añuití near San José del Cabo (1730–1767)
 Misión Santa Rosa de las Palmas in Todos Santos (1733–1767)
 Misión San Luis Gonzaga Chiriyaqui (1740–1767)
 Misión Santa Gertrudis near San Ignacio (1752–1767)
 Misión San Francisco Borja near Bahía de los Ángeles (1762–1767)
 Visita de Calamajué (1766–1767)
 Misión Santa María de los Ángeles near Cataviña (1767)
  in Teapa, Tabasco (1712–1767)
 College of the Holy Trinity in Guanajuato City (1744–1767), now Universidad de Guanajuato and  
 College of the Immaculate Conception in Zacatecas City (1749–1767), now Museo Pedro Coronel and Church of Saint Dominic
 East Institute in Puebla (since 1870)
 College of San Juan Nepomucene in Saltillo (1878–1914)
  in Mexico City (1893–1914)
 Instituto de Ciencias, Zapopan, Jalisco (since 1906)
 Lux Institute in León, Guanajuato (since 1941)
 Carlos Pereyra School in Torreón, Coahuila (since 1942)
 Universidad Iberoamericana in Mexico City (since 1943) with campuses created later in León, Tijuana, Torreón and Puebla
 ITESO, Universidad Jesuita de Guadalajara in Tlaquepaque, Jalisco (since 1957)
 Instituto Cultural Tampico in Tampico, Tamaulipas (since 1962)
 Universidad Iberoamericana León in León, Guanajuato (since 1978)
 Campus of Universidad Iberoamericana and Ibero College in Tijuana (since 1982)
 Iberoamerican University Torreón in Torreón, Coahuila (since 1982)
 Universidad Iberoamericana Puebla in Puebla (since 1983)
 Miguel Pro Human Rights Center in Mexico City (since 1988)
 Jesuit Migrant Service, Mexico in Mexico City (since 2001), with offices in Tecozautla and Frontera Comalapa
 Intercultural Institute of Ayuuk in Jaltepec de Candayoc, Oaxaca (since 2006)

Nicaragua
 Colegio Centro América in Managua (since 1916)
 Instituto Loyola in Managua (since 1946)

Panama

 Jesuit college of Saint Ignatius in Panama City (1641–1767), now standing ruins of Iglesia de la Compañía in the Casco Viejo
 Xavier College in Panama City (since 1948)

Paraguay

 Jesuit college in Asunción (1594–1767), now Congress of Paraguay
 Mission of San Ignacio Guazú in San Ignacio, Misiones Department (1610–1767)
 , Itapúa Department (1632–1767)
 , Misiones Department (1647–1767)
 , Misiones Department (1669–1767)
 Mission of Santa Rosa de Lima, Misiones Department (1698–1767)
 Mission of Santisima Trinidad de Parana, Itapúa Department (1706–1767)
 Mission of Jesús de Tavarangue, Itapúa Department (1760–1767)
 Colegio Cristo Rey in Asunción (since 1938)
 Xavier Technical College in Asunción (since 1970)
 Higher Institute of Humanistic and Philosophical Studies in Asunción (since 1978)

Peru

  in Lima (1568–1767), now Central Reserve Bank of Peru, National Library of Peru and Basilica and Convent of San Pedro
  in Andahuaylillas near Cusco (1570–1767)
  in Lima (1582–1767)
 Royal college in Lima (1592–1767), now 
  in Cusco (1598–1692); precursor to the National University of Saint Anthony the Abbot, which eventually also absorbed the former Jesuit university 
 Novitiate of Saint Anthony the Abbot in Lima (1605–1767), now Centro Cultural "La Casona" of National University of San Marcos
  for Colonists in Cusco (1619–1767), now cultural center of the 
  for Native Peruvians in Cusco (1619–1767), now a school of the same name (Colegio San Francisco de Borja)
 Jesuit reduction of San Pablo de Nuevo Napeanos, now Iquitos, Maynas Province (1764–1767)
 Colegio de la Inmaculada in Lima (since 1878)
 Colegio San José in Arequipa (since 1898)
 Cristo Rey College in Tacna (since 1962)
 Universidad del Pacífico in Lima (since 1962)
 Jesus the Worker Agro-industrial Training Center in Quispicanchi Province (since 1971)
 Radio Marañón in Jaén (since 1976)
 School of Pedagogy, Philosophy, and Literature Antonio Ruiz de Montoya, now Antonio Ruiz de Montoya University in Lima (since 1991)

United States

Eastern Seaboard
 Santa Elena settlement on Parris Island, South Carolina (late 1560s–1587)
 Ajacán Mission on an undetermined location in Virginia (1570–1571)
 Jesuit mission in St. Mary's City, Maryland (1634–1645)
 Saint Ignatius Manor in St. Inigoes, Maryland (1637-late 18th century)
 Newton Manor in Compton, Maryland (1640-early 19th century), now St. Francis Xavier Church and Newtown Manor House Historic District
 St. Thomas Manor in Port Tobacco Village, Maryland (since 1641)
 Mission of Sainte Marie among the Iroquois near Syracuse, New York (1656–1658)
 Jesuit mission in Norridgewock, Maine (1694–1724)
 Bohemia Manor in Warwick, Maryland (1704-?), now St. Francis Xavier Church
 White Marsh Manor in Bowie, Maryland (1741-?), now Sacred Heart Church
 Priest Neal's Mass House and Mill Site in Bel Air, Harford County, Maryland (c.1743–1773)
 Holy Trinity Catholic Church in Washington, D.C. (since 1787)
 Georgetown Preparatory School in North Bethesda, Maryland (since 1805)
 Georgetown University in Washington, D.C. (since 1805), including the Dahlgren Chapel of the Sacred Heart and Jesuit Community Cemetery
 Gonzaga College High School in Washington, D.C. (since 1821), including St. Aloysius Church
 Fordham University and Fordham Preparatory School in New York City (since 1841), including Fordham University Church
 College of the Holy Cross in Worcester, Massachusetts (since 1843)
 Xavier High School in New York City (since 1847)
 Saint Joseph's University and St. Joseph's Preparatory School in Philadelphia (since 1851)
 Loyola University Maryland and St. Ignatius Church in Baltimore (since 1852)
 Boston College in Chestnut Hill, Massachusetts (since 1863)
 Woodstock College in Woodstock, Maryland (1869–1969), later in New York City (1969–1974)
 Saint Peter's University in Jersey City, New Jersey (since 1872)
 Church of St. Ignatius Loyola in New York City (since 1886)
 University of Scranton in Scranton, Pennsylvania (founded in 1888; under Jesuit control since 1942)
 Manresa Institute on Keyzer Island, now Manresa Island, Connecticut (1889–1911)
 Novitiate of St. Andrew-on-Hudson in Hyde Park, New York (1897–1970), now Culinary Institute of America at Hyde Park
 Regis High School in New York City (since 1914)
 Weston College in Weston, Massachusetts (1922–2008), merged in 2008 into Boston College School of Theology and Ministry 
 Fairfield University in Fairfield, Connecticut (since 1942)
 Le Moyne College in Syracuse, New York (since 1946)
 Jesuit Volunteer Corps in Baltimore (since 1956)
 Belen Jesuit Preparatory School in Tamiami, Florida (since 1962), following relocation from Cuba
 Center of Concern in Washington, D.C. (1971–2018)
 St. Peter's Catholic Church in Charlotte, North Carolina (since 1986)
 St. Raphael the Archangel Catholic Church in Raleigh, North Carolina (since 1996)

Middle West and Great Plains

 Mission of Sainte-Marie de Gannentaha at Liverpool, New York (1656–18th century)
  at Sault Ste. Marie, Michigan (1668–18th century), now Holy Name of Mary Pro-Cathedral
 Mission Saint-Ignace at St. Ignace, Michigan (1671–18th century)
 Mission Saint-François-Xavier at De Pere, Wisconsin (1671–18th century)
 Mission La Baye at Green Bay, Wisconsin (1671–18th century)
  at Saint-Joseph, Michigan (1680–18th century)
  at Kaskaskia, Illinois (1693–18th century)
 Mission of the Guardian Angel near Chicago (1696–1700)
 St. Mary's College near Lebanon, Kentucky (1833–1846)
 Saint Louis University and St. Francis Xavier College Church in St. Louis (since 1827)
 St. Joseph's Indian School in Chamberlain, South Dakota
 Xavier University in Norwood, Ohio (since 1840), until 1912 in Cincinnati next to St. Francis Xavier Church 
 Shrine of St. Joseph, St. Louis in St. Louis (1843–20th century)
 St. Mary's Mission (Kansas) in St. Marys, Kansas (1847–20th century)
 Saint Aloysius Academy in Milwaukee (since 1857), since 1881 Marquette University High School  
 Saint Ignatius College Prep and St. Ignatius College Prep in Chicago (since 1869)
 Canisius College in Buffalo, New York (since 1870)
 Loyola University Chicago in Chicago (since 1870)
 University of Detroit Jesuit High School and Academy in Detroit (since 1877)
 Creighton University and St. John's Parish in Omaha, Nebraska (since 1878)
 Marquette University in Milwaukee (since 1881) 
 John Carroll University in University Heights, Ohio (since 1886)
 Saint Ignatius High School in Ohio City, Cleveland (since 1886)
 Gesu Church in Milwaukee (since 1887)
 Rockhurst University in Kansas City, Missouri (since 1910)
 University of Detroit Mercy in Detroit (since 1927)
 Wheeling University in Wheeling, West Virginia (1954–2019)
 St. Xavier High School in Finneytown, Ohio (since 1960)
 Walsh Jesuit High School in Cuyahoga Falls, Ohio (since 1964)
 Homeboyz Interactive in Milwaukee (1996–2006)
 Ignatian Solidarity Network in University Heights, Ohio (since 2004)
St. John’s Jesuit High School in Toledo, Ohio

South

 Mission at Mound Key in Estero Bay, Florida (1566–1569), now Mound Key Archaeological State Park
 Spring Hill College in Mobile, Alabama (since 1847)
 Immaculate Conception Church in New Orleans (since 1857)
 Jesuit Outreach, Segundo Barrio in El Paso, Texas (since 1892)
 Jesuit High School in Tampa, Florida (since 1899)
 Cathedral of St. John Berchmans in Shreveport, Louisiana (since 1902)
 Loyola University New Orleans in New Orleans (since 1904)
 Manresa House of Retreats at the former Jefferson College in Convent, Louisiana (since 1922)
 Jesuit College Preparatory School in Dallas (since 1942)
 Strake Jesuit College Preparatory in Houston (since 1960)
 Jesuit High School (New Orleans) in New Orleans (since 1847)

West

 Mission Los Santos Ángeles de Guevavi near Nogales, Arizona (1691–1768)
 Mission San Xavier del Bac near Tucson, Arizona (1692–1768)
 Mission San Cosme y Damián de Tucsón in Tucson, Arizona (1692–1767)
 Mission San José de Tumacácori near Nogales, Arizona (1752–1768)
 Mission San Cayetano de Calabazas near Nogales, Arizona (1756–1768)
 Old Mission State Park in Cataldo, Idaho (1850-late 19th century?)
 Santa Clara University in Santa Clara, California (since 1851)
 Bellarmine College Preparatory in San Jose, California (since 1851)
 University of San Francisco in San Francisco (since 1855), including the Saint Ignatius Church and, since 1984, the Ricci Institute
 Jesuit High School in Sacramento, California (since 1963)
 Regis University in Denver (since 1877)
 Regis Jesuit High School in Aurora, Colorado (since 1877)
 Sacred Heart Retreat House near Sedalia, Colorado (since October 1959)
 Mount Saint Michael Seminary in Spokane, Washington (1878–1977)
 St. Francis Xavier Church in Missoula, Montana (since 1881)
 St. Peter's Mission Church and Cemetery in Cascade, Montana (1881–1898)
 St. Francis Mission in St. Francis, South Dakota (since 1886)
 Gonzaga University in Spokane, Washington (since 1887)
 Red Cloud Indian School in Pine Ridge, South Dakota (since 1888)
 Seattle University in Seattle (since 1891)
 Loyola Marymount University in Los Angeles (since 1911)
 Jesuit School of Theology of Santa Clara University in Berkeley, California (since 1934), relocated in 1969 from Los Gatos, California
 Dolores Mission in Los Angeles (since the early 1980s)
 Homeboy Industries in Los Angeles (since 1992)
 Kino Border Initiative in Nogales, Arizona (since 2008)

Puerto Rico
 Colegio San Ignacio de Loyola in San Juan, Puerto Rico (since 1952)

Uruguay

  in Montevideo (since 1880), including th Church of the Sacred Heart
 Catholic University of Uruguay in Montevideo (since 1985)

Venezuela

 Jesuit college of Saint Francis Xavier in Mérida (1628–1767)
 Jesuit residence in Maracaibo (c.1728–1767)
 Seminario Interdiocesano in Caracas (1916–53)
 St. Ignatius of Loyola College in Caracas (since 1923)
 Seminario Menor in Coro (1933–53)
 Gonzaga College in Maracaibo (since 1945)
 Instituto Técnico Jesús Obrero in Caracas (since 1948)
 Andrés Bello Catholic University in Caracas (since 1953)
 Colegio Javier in Barquisimeto (1953–83)
 Instituto Educativo Tamare in Zulia (1959–1964)
 Catholic University in Táchira (since 1962), initially an extension of Andrés Bello Catholic University
 Loyola College Gumilla in Ciudad Guayana (since 1965)
 Centro Gumilla in Caracas (since 1968)
 Jesus the Worker University Institute in Caracas (since 1997)

Africa and Middle East

Algeria
 Orphelinates in Ben Aknoun (1844–1881) and Boufarik (1850–1871) near Algiers

Angola
 Jesuit college of the Holy Name of Jesus in Luanda (1584–1759, with interruption 1641–1648), now Ministry of Justice, National Printing House and Igreja de Jesus
 Jesuit college in M'banza-Kongo (1623–1669)

Armenia
 Jesuit mission in Yerevan (1684-after 1722)

Azerbaijan
 Jesuit mission in Shamakhi (1686-after 1722)
 Jesuit mission in Ganja (1703-after 1722)

Burundi
 Holy Spirit Lycée in Bujumbura (since 1952)

Cameroon

  in Douala (since 1957)

Cape Verde
 Jesuit mission in Cape Verde (1604–1617)

Chad
 Centre for Studies and Training for Development in N'Djamena (since 1966)

Côte d'Ivoire
 African Institute for Economic and Social Development in Abidjan (since 1962), renamed in 2003 Centre for Research and Action for Peace

Democratic Republic of Congo

 Jesuit mission in Kwango (since 1893)
 Boboto College in Kinshasa (since 1937)
  in Bukavu (since 1941)
 Lovanium University in Kinshasa (1954–1971)
 Collège Sadisana in Kikwit (since 1958)
 Action sociale CHECHE in Bukavu (since 1963)
  in Kinshasa (since 1964)
 College N'Temo in Kasongo Lunda Territory (since 1966)
 Munzihirwa Centre in Kinshasa (since 1995)
 Collège Technique Mwapusukeni in Lubumbashi (since 2013)
 Loyola University of Congo in Kinshasa (since 2016)

Egypt
 Collège de la Sainte Famille in Cairo (since 1879)
 Jesuit Cultural Center in Alexandria (since 1953)

Equatorial Guinea
 Jesuit mission of Fernando Po on Bioko Island (1858–1872)

Ethiopia

  in Gorgora (1608–1633), now

Iran
 Jesuit mission in Hormuz (1549–1568)
 Jesuit mission in Isfahan (1647–1755), from 1651 in the New Julfa neighborhood

Iraq
 Baghdad College in Baghdad (1932–1969)
 Al-Hikma University in Baghdad (1956–1968), absorbed in 1969 by the University of Baghdad

Israel

 Pontifical Biblical Institute branch in Jerusalem (since 1927)

Kenya
 Hekima University College, Nairobi, Kenya (since 1984)

Lebanon

 Jesuit mission in Aintoura (1656–1784), now Collège Saint Joseph
 Jesuit residence in Zahlé (since the early 19th century)
 Jesuit residence in Bikfaya (since 1833)
 Jesuit school in Deir al-Qamar (1830s–1860)
  in Ghazir (1843–1875); precursor to Saint Joseph University 
  in Beirut (since 1848)
 Collège Notre Dame de Jamhour in Baabda near Beirut (since 1850)
 Château Ksara winery in the Beqaa Valley (1857–1973)
 Jesuit monastery at Taanayel, near Zahlé (since 1860)
 Saint Joseph University in Beirut (since 1875)

Liberia
 Xavier Jesuit School in Wein Town, Paynesville (since 2007)

Madagascar
 College of Saint Michael, Amparibe in Antananarivo (since 1888)
 Ambohidempona Observatory in Antananarivo (1889–1923)
 Xavier College in Fianarantsoa (since 1952)
 Immaculate Conception College in Mananjary, Fianarantsoa (since 1955)
 Higher Vocational Agricultural School of Bevalala in Antananarivo (since 1957)
 Saint Paul Tsaramasoandro Philosophate in Antananarivo (since 1957)
 Saint Michael Higher Technical Institute, Amparibe in Antananarivo (since 1983)
 SAMIS-ESIC School of Information and Communication, Amparibem (since 2001)

Malawi
 Loyola Jesuit Secondary School in Kasungu District (since 2015)

Morocco
 Agricultural college in Temara (1951-1984)

Mozambique
 Jesuit college on the Island of Mozambique (1610–1759), now Palace and Chapel of São Paulo
 Jesuit college in Tete (1611–18th century)
 Jesuit seminary in Vila de Sena (1697–18th century)

Nigeria
 St. Francis Catholic Secondary School in Lagos (since 1990)
 Loyola Jesuit College in Abuja (since 1996)
 Jesuit Memorial College in Port Harcourt (since 2013)

Rwanda
 St. Ignatius School in Kigali (since 2006)

South Africa
 Saint Aidan's College in Makhanda, Eastern Cape (1875–1973)

Syria
 Jesuit residence and school in Aleppo (mid-17th century), with satellite schools in Sidon (Lebanon) and Damascus
  in Aleppo (since 1926)

Turkey

 Church of Saint Benedict in Istanbul (1583–1584 and 1610–1628)
 Jesuit mission in Edirne (1680–1706)
 Jesuit mission in Smyrna (18th century)

Uganda
 Ocer Campion Jesuit College in Gulu (since 2010)

United Arab Emirates
 Saint Joseph University in Dubai (since 2008)

Zambia

 Chikuni Mission in Monze District (since 1905), now Canisius Secondary School
 Charles Lwanga College of Education in Chisekesi between Monze and Pemba (since 1959)
 Kasisi Agricultural Training Centre near Lusaka (since 1974)
 Jesuit Centre for Theological Reflection in Lusaka (since 1988)

Zimbabwe

 St. George's College in Harare (since 1896)
 Mt St Mary's Mission School in Mashonaland East Province (1954–94)
 Saint Ignatius College in Harare (since 1962)
 St. Peter's Kubatana in Harare (since 1963)
 Silveira House in Chishawasha near Harare (since 1964)
 Visitation-Makumbi High School near Harare (since 1973)
 Arrupe College in Harare (since 1994)
 St. Rupert Mayer's High School in Makonde District (since 2000)
 St. Paul's High School, Musami in Murehwa District

South Asia

Bangladesh
 St Francis Xavier's Green Herald International School in Dhaka (since 1912)

Bhutan
 Sherubtse College in Kanglung (1966–2003)

India

Andhra Pradesh
 Andhra Loyola College in Vijayawada (since 1953)
 Loyola High School, Vinukonda in Guntur (since 1960)
 Loyola Public School in Guntur (since 1964)
 St. John's High School, Amalapuram in Vijayawada (since 1968)
 Loyola High School in Hindupur (since 1990)
 St. Xavier's High School in Darsi (since 1993)
 St. Xavier's College of Education in Hindupur (since 2007)
 Loyola High School, KD Peta in Golugonda (since 2008)

Bihar

 St. Michael's High School in Patna (since 1858)
 Khrist Raja High School in Bettiah (since 1927)
 St. Xavier's High School in Patna (since 1940)
 Bihar Dalit Development Organization in Barh, Patna district (since 1982)
 St. Xavier's College of Education in Patna (since 1988)
 St. Xavier's Higher Secondary School in Bettiah (since 1998)
 St. Xavier's College in Patna (since 2009)

Dadra and Nagar Haveli and Daman and Diu

 Jesuit church of Saint Paul, a former mosque, in Daman (1558–1759)
 St. Paul's Church, Diu (1601–1759)

Delhi
 St. Xavier's School (since 1960)
 Indian Social Institute (since 1963); from 1961 to 1963 in Pune
 Vidyajyoti College of Theology (since 1972), previously in (West) Bengal since 1879
 St. Xavier's School, Rohini (since 1990)

Goa

 Saint Paul's College in Old Goa (1542–1767), the first Jesuit educational institution
  in Old Goa (1548–1759)
  in Margao (1564–1759)
 Church of Our Lady of the Snows in Rachol (1565–1759)
 Basilica of Bom Jesus in Old Goa (1594–1759), which holds the mortal remains of Francis Xavier
 Loyola High School in Margao (since 1944)
 Saint Britto High School in Mapusa (since 1946)
 St. Xavier's College, Mapusa, Goa in Mapusa (since 1963)
 Thomas Stephens Konknni Kendr in Porvorim (since 1982)

Gujarat

 St. Xavier's High School, Loyola Hall in Ahmedabad (since 1934)
 St. Xavier's High School, Mirzapur in Ahmedabad (since 1935)
 St. Xavier's College in Ahmedabad (since 1955)
 St. Xavier's High School in Surat (since 1963)
 St. Xavier's Social Service Society in Ahmedabad (since 1976)
 Unteshwari Mata Mandir shrine in Kadi (since 1982)

Jharkhand

 St. John's High School in Ranchi (since 1887)
 St. Xavier's College in Ranchi (since 1944)
 Loyola School in Jamshedpur (since 1947)
 XLRI - Xavier School of Management in Jamshedpur (since 1949)
 Xavier Institute of Social Service in Ranchi (since 1955)
 De Nobili Schools named after Roberto de Nobili in Dhanbad district and Bokaro district: 
 De Nobili School, FRI in Dhanbad (since 1956)
 De Nobili School, Sindri in Dhanbad (since 1963)
 De Nobili School, Sijua in Dhanbad (since 1975)
 De Nobili School, Mugma in Nirsa (since 1977)
 De Nobili School, Bhuli in Dhanbad (since 2009)
 De Nobili School, Maithon in Nirsa
 De Nobili School CTPS in Chandrapura, Bokaro district
 St. Xavier's School in Sahibganj (since 1957)
 St. Xavier's School in Ranchi (since 1960)
 St. Xavier's School in Bokaro Steel City (since 1966)
 Loyola College of Education, Jamshedpur (since 1976), until 1992 as a college of XLRI
 De Nobili School, CMRI in Dhanbad (since 1977)
 St. Xavier's English School in Chakradharpur (since 1998)
 St. Xavier's College in Dumka (since 2011)
 Loyola Collegiate School in Jamshedpur (since 2015)

Karnataka

 St. Paul's School in Belgaum (since 1856)
 The St. Joseph's Institutions in Bangalore: 
 St. Joseph's Boy's High School (since 1858)
 St. Joseph's College (Autonomous), Bangalore (since 1937)
 St. Joseph's Indian High School (since 1937)
 St. Joseph's College of Commerce (Autonomous) (since 1972)
 St. Joseph's Institute of Management (since 1968)
 St. Joseph's Pre-University College (since 2001)
 St. Joseph's College of Law (since 2017)
 St. Aloysius College in Mangalore (since 1880), including St. Aloysius Chapel
 St. Joseph's School in Hassan (since 1956)
 St. Aloysius Evening College in Mangalore (since 1966)
 St. Joseph's Institute of Management in Bangalore (since 1968)
 St. Aloysius Industrial Training Institute in Mangalore (since 1981)
 Loyola Industrial Training Institute in Bangalore (since 1992)
 St. Joseph School, Anekal in Anekal near Bangalore (since 1992), and its prep school St. Joseph's Pre-University College (since 2010)
 Indian Social Institute in Bangalore (since 1993)
 Loyola School & Pre-University College in Mundgod (since 1994)
 Xavier School in Manvi (since 2004)
 St. Joseph's Community College in Bangalore (since 2005)
 St. Aloysius Pre-University College in Harihar (since 2005)
 St. Aloysius Institute of Education in Mangalore (since 2006)
 St. Joseph's College in Hassan (since 2009)
 St. Aloysius College in Harihar (since 2010)
 Loyola Pre-University College in Manvi (since 2010)
 St. Xavier's Pre-University College in Gulbarga (since 2010)
 Loyola College in Manvi (since 2012)

Kerala

 Vaipikotta Seminary near Kochi (1577–1759)
 Headquarters of Malabar Vice-Province in Kochi (1601–1759)
 Old Church of Saint Thomas in Pala (1702–1759)
 St. Michael's School in Kannur (since 1887)
 Loyola School in Thiruvananthapuram (since 1961)
 AKJM Public School in Kanjirappally (since 1961)
 Loyola College of Social Sciences in Thiruvananthapuram (since 1963)
 St. Xavier's College, Thumba in Thiruvananthapuram (since 1964)
 St Ignatius Church in Thiruvananthapuram (since 1986)

Madhya Pradesh
 Campion School in Bhopal (since 1965)
 Xavier Institute of Development Action and Studies (XIDAS) in Jabalpur (since 1995)

Maharashtra

 Jesuit college in Vasai near Mumbai (1560–1739), now Fort Bassein site
 Jesuit schools in Bandra (1570–1759) and at Revdanda fort in Chaul
 St. Stanislaus High School in Bandra, Mumbai (since 1863)
 St. Mary's High School SSC in Mumbai (since 1864)
 St. Mary's School ICSE in Mumbai (since 1864)
 St. Vincent's High School in Pune (since 1867)
 St. Xavier's College in Mumbai (since 1869)
 St. Xavier's High School, Fort in Mumbai (since 1869)
 St. Mary's School, Sangamner in Ahmednagar (since 1892)
 St. Xavier's Technical Institute in Mumbai (since 1937)
 Campion School in Mumbai (since 1943)
 Holy Family High School in Mumbai (since 1945)
 Dnyanmata Vidyalaya, Sangamner in Ahmednagar (since 1948)
 St. Xavier's Institute of Education in Mumbai (since 1953)
 Papal Seminary and Jnana Deepa, Institute of Philosophy and Theology in Pune (since 1955)
 St. Xavier's Boys' Academy, Mumbai in Mumbai (since 1957)
 St. Xavier's School in Kolhapur (since 1957)
 St. Joseph's Technical Institute in Pune (since 1959)
 Loyola High School in Pune (since 1961)
 St. Xavier's High School in Nashik (since 1961)
 House of Love in Mumbai (since 1962)
 St. Vincent College of Commerce in Pune (since 1970)
 Prabodhan Vidyalaya School in Amravati (since 1983)
 Xavier Institute of Engineering in Mumbai (since 2005)
 St. Xavier's English Medium School (ICSE) in Manickpur (since 2006)

Odisha

 Xavier Institute of Management in Bhubaneswar (since 1987)
 St. Xavier's School, Rutungia in Kandhamal (since 1995)
 St. Joseph's School in Kendrapara (since 1996)
 Loyola School in Bhubaneswar (since 2001)
 Loyola School in Baripada (since 2002)
 Xavier University in Bhubaneswar (since 2013)
 Loyola School in Kalinganagar (since 2016)

Puducherry

 Church of Our Lady of Good Health in Ariyankuppam (1690–1773)
 Jesuit college of Pondicherry (1689–1773), now the Immaculate Conception Cathedral

Rajasthan

 St. Xavier's School in Jaipur (since 1941)
 St. Xavier's School in Behror (since 1991)
 St. Xavier's School in Bhiwadi (since 1993)
 St. Xavier's College in Jaipur (since 2010)
 St. Xavier's School, Nevta in Jaipur (since 2015)
 St. Xavier's High School in Mahua

Tamil Nadu

  in Punnaikayal (1544–1663)
 Basilica of Our Lady of Snows in Thoothukudi (1582–1773, with interruption from 1658 to before 1713)
 Shrine of Saint John de Britto (Arul Anandar) in Orur (since 1734)
 St. Joseph's College in Tiruchirappalli (since 1844)
 St. Mary's Higher Secondary School in Dindigul (since 1850)
 St. Joseph Boys Higher Secondary School in Tiruchirappalli (since 1862)
 St. Xavier's Higher Secondary School in Palayamkottai (since 1880)
 St. Xavier's Higher Secondary School in Thoothukudi (since 1884)
 St. Arul Anandar School in Orur (since 1908)
 St. Mary's Higher Secondary School in Madurai (since 1908)
 Carmel Higher Secondary School in Nagercoil (since 1922)
 St. Xavier's College in Palayamkottai (since 1923)
 Loyola College in Chennai (since 1925)
 Loyola College of Education established in 2007
 De Britto Higher Secondary School in Devakottai (since 1943)
 Arul Anandar College, Karumathur in Madurai (since 1970)
 Loyola Institute of Business Administration in Chennai (since 1979)
 Loyola Higher Secondary School, Kuppayanallur in Kanchipuram district (since 1995)
 Loyola-ICAM College of Engineering and Technology in Chennai (since 2010)
 Loyola Academy in Maraimalai Nagar near Chennai (since 2011)

Telangana
 St. Patrick's High School in Secunderabad (since 1911)
 Loyola Academy in Secunderabad (since 1976)
 St. Xavier's High School in Suryapet (since 1976)
 Loyola High School in Karimnagar (since 1980)
 St.Paul's High School in Hyderabad (since 1954)
 Little Flowers High School in Hyderabad (since 1953)
 St.Gabriel's High School in Kazipet (since 1955)
 All Saints High School in Hyderabad (since 1855)
 St. Alphonsus High School in Nalgonda (since 1965)

Uttar Pradesh

 Akbar's Church in Agra (1599–1803)

West Bengal

 St. Xavier's College in Kolkata (since 1860)
 St. Xavier's Collegiate School in Kolkata (since 1860)
 Ecole Sainte-Marie in Chandannagar (1862–1887), now Chandernagore Government College 
 St. James' School in Kolkata (since 1864)
 Saint Joseph's Seminary (1879–1971), initially in Asansol and after 1889 in Kurseong; moved to Delhi in 1972
 St. Joseph's School in Darjeeling (since 1888)
 St. Joseph's College in Darjeeling (since 1927)
 St. Lawrence High School in Kolkata (since 1937)
 Loyola High School in Kolkata (since 1961)
 St. Xavier's School in Durgapur (since 1963)
 St. Xavier's School in Bardhaman (since 1964)
 Church of the Lord Jesus in Kolkata (since 1969)
 St. Xavier's School in Raiganj (since 1999)
 North Bengal St. Xavier's College in Jalpaiguri (since 2007)
 St. Xavier's College in Bardhaman (since 2014)
 St. Xavier's College in Asansol (since 2015)
 St. Xavier's University in Kolkata (since 2017)
 St. Xavier’s School, Haldia in Howrah (since 2019)

Nepal

 St. Xavier's School in Jawalakhel near Lalitpur (since 1951)
 St. Xavier's School in Godawari, Lalitpur (since 1951)
 St. Xavier's College, Maitighar in Kathmandu (since 1988)

Pakistan

 St. Patrick's High School in Karachi (1861–1950)
 Saint Patrick's Cathedral in Karachi (1881–1935), and the Monument to Christ the King built 1927
 St. Francis Xavier Seminary near Lahore (since 1990)

Sri Lanka

 St. Xavier's College in Nuwara Eliya (since 1859)
 Jnana Deepa, Institute of Philosophy and Theology in Kandy (1893–1955)
 St. Aloysius' College in Galle (1895–1971)
 St. Servatius' College in Matara (1897–1965)
 St Joseph's College in Trincomalee (since 1901)
 St. Xavier's College in Marawila, Puttalam District (since 1942)
 St. Xavier's Boys' College and St. Xavier's Girls' College in Mannar

East & Southeast Asia

China

 Shangchuan Island (上川岛, "Saint John") in Guangdong, the place of death of Francis Xavier on 3 December 1552
  in Macau (1558–1762)
 St. Paul's College in Macau (1594–1762), now the Ruins of Saint Paul's, burial place of Alessandro Valignano
 Jesuit church in Nanjing (1599-1618), rebuilt in 1870 as the Cathedral of the Immaculate Conception
 Xuanwumen (宣武门礼拜堂) or Nantang (南堂) Church in Beijing (1601–1690), now the Cathedral of the Immaculate Conception 
 Zhalan Cemetery (栅栏墓地) in Beijing (1611–1773)
 Fortaleza do Monte in Macau (1616–1626)
 Jesuit establishment in Tsaparang, Tibet (1624–28)
 Cathedral of the Immaculate Conception in Hangzhou (1627–1730, with interruption 1691–1692)
 Jingyi Church in Shanghai (1640–1731, with interruption 1665–1671)
 Guangqi Park in Xujiahui, Shanghai, final resting place of Xu Guangqi (since 1641)
 Beijing Ancient Observatory in Beijing (1644–1773)
 Wangfujing (王府井天主堂) or Dongtang (東堂) Church in Beijing (1653–1773), now St. Joseph's Church 
 Xishiku (西什库天主堂) or Beitang (北堂) Church in Beijing (1694–1773), now Church of the Saviour 
 St. Joseph's Seminary and Church in Macao (1728–1762)
 St. Francis Xavier Church also known as Dongjiadu Cathedral (董家渡天主堂) in Shanghai (1847–1966)
 Bibliotheca Zi-Ka-Wei in Xujiahui, Shanghai (1847–1956)
 Xuhui High School in Xujiahui, Shanghai (1850–1949)
 St. Ignatius Cathedral in Xujiahui, Shanghai (1851–1966 and since 1978)
  in Suzhou (19th century–1958)
  in Shanghai (1872–1945), now Shanghai Meteorological Bureau
 St. Joseph Cathedral in Wuhu (1883–1966)
 Aurora University in Shanghai (1903–1952)
 St. Francis Xavier's College in Shanghai (1874–1893)
 Ricci Hall at the University of Hong Kong in Hong Kong (since 1929)
  in Shanghai (1933–1953)
 Wah Yan College, Hong Kong and Wah Yan College, Kowloon (since 1932, with interruption 1941–1945)
 St. Francis Xavier's School, Tsuen Wan in Hong Kong (since 1963)
 The Beijing Center for Chinese Studies at the University of International Business and Economics in Beijing (since 1998)
 Ricci Institute in Macau (since 1999)

Taiwan
 Fu Jen Catholic University in New Taipei City (since 1961)
 Church of the Holy Family near Daan Forest Park in Taipei (since 1964)
 Taipei Ricci Institute in Taipei (since 1966)
 Rerum Novarum Centre in Taipei (since 1971)

East Timor
 St Joseph's High School in Dili (since 1993)
 St. Ignatius of Loyola College in Dili (since 2013)
 St. John de Britto Institute in Dili (since 2016)

Indonesia

 Jesuit mission on Ambon Island (1578–1605) and Ternate
 Peter Canisius Minor Seminary Mertoyudan in Yogyakarta, Java (since 1912)
 Canisius College in Jakarta, Java  (since 1927)
 De Britto High School in Yogyakarta, Java (since 1948)
 Kolese Loyola in Semarang, Central Java (since 1949)
 PIKA Industrial Woodworking School in Semarang, Central Java (since 1953)
 Sanata Dharma University, Yogyakarta, Java (since 1955), and Mechatronics Polytechnic of Sanata Dharma since 2011
 St. Michael Technical School in Surakarta, Central Java (since 1962)
 KPTT Agricultural Training Center in Salatiga (since 1965)
 Polytechnic ATMI Surakarta, Central Java (since 1968)
 Kolese Gonzaga in Jakarta, Java (since 1987), and Wacana Bhakti Seminary on the same campus since 1988
 College Le Cocq d'Armandville in Nabire, Papua (since 1987)

Japan

 Jesuit outpost in Yokoseura, Kyushu (1562–1563)
  in Kyoto (1576–1587)
 Dejima Island in Nagasaki, Kyushu (1580–1588)
 Jesuit art school (Seminario dei Pittori) in Kumamoto and other locations (c.1590–1614)
 Sophia University in Tokyo (since 1913), including the 
 Rokko Junior and Senior High School in Kobe (since 1937)
 Elisabeth University of Music in Hiroshima (since 1947)
 Eiko Gakuen in Kamakura (since 1947)
 Hiroshima Academy Junior and Senior High School in Hiroshima (since 1956)
 Sophia Fukuoka Junior and Senior High School in Fukuoka (since 1983)

Malaysia

 Church of Saint Paul in Malacca City (1548–1641)
 St. Francis Xavier's Church in Petaling Jaya near Kuala Lumpur (since 1957)

Philippines

 Jesuit college of Manila (1587–1767), from 1621 Universidad de San Ignacio, destroyed (including the San Ignacio Church) during the Battle of Manila (1945); partly reconstructed from 2009 and reopened in 2018 as the Museo de Intramuros
 Colegio de San Ildefonso in Cebu City (1595–1767)
 Guiuan Church in Guiuan, Eastern Samar (1595–1768)
 Santa Cruz Church in Manila (1619–1773)
 Ateneo de Manila University in Quezon City (since 1859), founded as Escuela Municipal de Manila, with Church of the Gesù built 2001–2002
 Manila Observatory in Manila (since 1865)
 Immaculate Conception Parish Church in Jasaan, Misamis Oriental (since 1887)
 Ateneo de Zamboanga University in Zamboanga City (since 1912)
 Xavier University – Ateneo de Cagayan in Cagayan de Oro, Misamis Oriental (since 1933)
 Loyola College of Culion, Palawan, originally Culion Catholic Primary School (since 1936)
 Ateneo de Naga University, Naga, Camarines Sur (since 1940)
 Ateneo de San Pablo in San Pablo City (1947–1978)
 Ateneo de Davao University, Davao City (since 1948)
 Ateneo de Tuguegarao in Tuguegarao, Cagayan (1949–1962)
 Sacred Heart School – Ateneo de Cebu in Mandaue (since 1955)
 Xavier School in San Juan City (since 1956)
 Ateneo de Iloilo in Iloilo City (since 2004) 
 Xavier School in Nuvali, Calamba, Laguna (since 2012)

Republic of Korea

 Sogang University in Seoul (since 1960)

Thailand
 Jesuit mission in Ayutthaya (1670–1767)
 Jesuit observatory in Lopburi (1685–1687)

Vietnam
 Pontifical Seminary of the Immaculate Heart of the Blessed Virgin Mary at Dalat University in Da Lat (1958–1977)
 Alexandre de Rhodes Center in Ho Chi Minh City (1959–1980)

Oceania

Australia

 Xavier College in the Kew suburb of Melbourne (since 1872)
 St Aloysius' College in Sydney (since 1879)
 Saint Ignatius' College in Riverview near Sydney (since 1880)
 St. Ignatius Loyola Church in the City of Brisbane (since 1916)
 Newman College in Melbourne (since 1918)
 St. Louis School in Claremont, Western Australia (1938–1971)
 Saint Ignatius' College in Adelaide (since 1951)
 Jesuit Social Services in Victoria (since 1977)
 Saint Ignatius College in Geelong (since 2007)

Micronesia
 Xavier High School on Weno Island (since 1952)
 Ponape Agricultural and Trade School in Pohnpei (1960s?–2005)

New Zealand
 Holy Name Seminary in Christchurch (1947–1978)

Palau
 Sacred Heart Church in Koror (since 1921)

See also
 List of Jesuit educational institutions
 List of schools named after Francis Xavier
 List of Carthusian monasteries
 List of Knights Hospitaller sites
 List of Knights Templar sites
 List of sites of the Dominican Order

Notes

Lists of Christian buildings and structures
Buildings
Catholic Church-related lists